= List of MeSH codes (D12.644) =

The following is a partial list of the "D" codes for Medical Subject Headings (MeSH), as defined by the United States National Library of Medicine (NLM).

This list continues the information at List of MeSH codes (D12.125). Codes following these are found at List of MeSH codes (D12.776). For other MeSH codes, see List of MeSH codes.

The source for this content is the set of 2006 MeSH Trees from the NLM.

== MeSH D12.644 – peptides ==
=== MeSH D12.644.050 – antimicrobial cationic peptides ===
- MeSH D12.644.050.200 – defensins
- MeSH D12.644.050.200.050 – alpha defensins
- MeSH D12.644.050.200.075 – beta defensins

=== MeSH D12.644.120 – cholecystokinin ===
- MeSH D12.644.120.700 – sincalide

=== MeSH D12.644.233 – glycopeptides ===
- MeSH D12.644.233.050 – acetylmuramyl-alanyl-isoglutamine
- MeSH D12.644.233.110 – bleomycin
- MeSH D12.644.233.110.690 – peplomycin
- MeSH D12.644.233.110.710 – phleomycins
- MeSH D12.644.233.594 – peptidoglycan
- MeSH D12.644.233.697 – ristocetin
- MeSH D12.644.233.800 – sialoglycoproteins
- MeSH D12.644.233.800.174 – antigens, cd43
- MeSH D12.644.233.800.350 – glycophorin
- MeSH D12.644.233.900 – teicoplanin
- MeSH D12.644.233.925 – vancomycin

=== MeSH D12.644.276 – intercellular signaling peptides and proteins ===
- MeSH D12.644.276.100 – angiogenic proteins
- MeSH D12.644.276.100.100 – angiopoietins
- MeSH D12.644.276.100.100.100 – angiopoietin-1
- MeSH D12.644.276.100.100.200 – angiopoietin-2
- MeSH D12.644.276.100.450 – angiostatic proteins
- MeSH D12.644.276.100.450.500 – angiostatins
- MeSH D12.644.276.100.450.750 – endostatins
- MeSH D12.644.276.100.800 – vascular endothelial growth factors
- MeSH D12.644.276.100.800.200 – vascular endothelial growth factor a
- MeSH D12.644.276.100.800.300 – vascular endothelial growth factor b
- MeSH D12.644.276.100.800.400 – vascular endothelial growth factor c
- MeSH D12.644.276.100.800.500 – vascular endothelial growth factor d
- MeSH D12.644.276.100.800.600 – vascular endothelial growth factor, endocrine-gland-derived
- MeSH D12.644.276.174 – cytokines
- MeSH D12.644.276.174.050 – autocrine motility factor
- MeSH D12.644.276.174.200 – chemokines
- MeSH D12.644.276.174.200.070 – beta-thromboglobulin
- MeSH D12.644.276.174.200.100 – chemokines, c
- MeSH D12.644.276.174.200.110 – chemokines, cc
- MeSH D12.644.276.174.200.120 – chemokines, cxc
- MeSH D12.644.276.174.200.130 – chemokines, cx3c
- MeSH D12.644.276.174.200.508 – interleukin-8
- MeSH D12.644.276.174.200.600 – macrophage inflammatory proteins
- MeSH D12.644.276.174.200.600.500 – macrophage inflammatory protein-1
- MeSH D12.644.276.174.200.610 – monocyte chemoattractant proteins
- MeSH D12.644.276.174.200.610.600 – monocyte chemoattractant protein-1
- MeSH D12.644.276.174.200.700 – platelet factor 4
- MeSH D12.644.276.174.200.750 – rantes
- MeSH D12.644.276.174.400 – growth substances
- MeSH D12.644.276.174.400.442 – hematopoietic cell growth factors
- MeSH D12.644.276.174.400.442.240 – colony-stimulating factors
- MeSH D12.644.276.174.400.442.240.075 – colony-stimulating factors, recombinant
- MeSH D12.644.276.174.400.442.240.075.350 – granulocyte colony stimulating factor, recombinant
- MeSH D12.644.276.174.400.442.240.075.350.275 – filgrastim
- MeSH D12.644.276.174.400.442.240.075.375 – granulocyte macrophage colony-stimulating factors, recombinant
- MeSH D12.644.276.174.400.442.240.150 – erythropoietin
- MeSH D12.644.276.174.400.442.240.150.250 – erythropoietin, recombinant
- MeSH D12.644.276.174.400.442.240.150.250.250 – epoetin alfa
- MeSH D12.644.276.174.400.442.240.350 – granulocyte colony-stimulating factor
- MeSH D12.644.276.174.400.442.240.350.375 – granulocyte colony stimulating factor, recombinant
- MeSH D12.644.276.174.400.442.240.350.375.275 – filgrastim
- MeSH D12.644.276.174.400.442.240.375 – granulocyte-macrophage colony-stimulating factor
- MeSH D12.644.276.174.400.442.240.375.275 – granulocyte macrophage colony-stimulating factors, recombinant
- MeSH D12.644.276.174.400.442.240.400 – interleukin-3
- MeSH D12.644.276.174.400.442.240.500 – macrophage colony-stimulating factor
- MeSH D12.644.276.174.400.442.240.750 – thrombopoietin
- MeSH D12.644.276.174.400.442.800 – stem cell factor
- MeSH D12.644.276.174.400.505 – interleukins
- MeSH D12.644.276.174.400.505.501 – interleukin-1
- MeSH D12.644.276.174.400.505.502 – interleukin-2
- MeSH D12.644.276.174.400.505.503 – interleukin-3
- MeSH D12.644.276.174.400.505.504 – interleukin-4
- MeSH D12.644.276.174.400.505.505 – interleukin-5
- MeSH D12.644.276.174.400.505.506 – interleukin-6
- MeSH D12.644.276.174.400.505.507 – interleukin-7
- MeSH D12.644.276.174.400.505.508 – interleukin-8
- MeSH D12.644.276.174.400.505.509 – interleukin-9
- MeSH D12.644.276.174.400.505.510 – interleukin-10
- MeSH D12.644.276.174.400.505.511 – interleukin-11
- MeSH D12.644.276.174.400.505.512 – interleukin-12
- MeSH D12.644.276.174.400.505.513 – interleukin-13
- MeSH D12.644.276.174.400.505.514 – interleukin-14
- MeSH D12.644.276.174.400.505.515 – interleukin-15
- MeSH D12.644.276.174.400.505.516 – interleukin-16
- MeSH D12.644.276.174.400.505.517 – interleukin-17
- MeSH D12.644.276.174.400.505.518 – interleukin-18
- MeSH D12.644.276.174.400.800 – transforming growth factor beta
- MeSH D12.644.276.174.420 – hepatocyte growth factor
- MeSH D12.644.276.174.440 – interferons
- MeSH D12.644.276.174.440.890 – interferon type i
- MeSH D12.644.276.174.440.890.125 – interferon type i, recombinant
- MeSH D12.644.276.174.440.890.125.100 – interferon alfa-2a
- MeSH D12.644.276.174.440.890.125.150 – interferon alfa-2b
- MeSH D12.644.276.174.440.890.125.200 – interferon alfa-2c
- MeSH D12.644.276.174.440.890.250 – interferon-alpha
- MeSH D12.644.276.174.440.890.250.100 – interferon alfa-2a
- MeSH D12.644.276.174.440.890.250.150 – interferon alfa-2b
- MeSH D12.644.276.174.440.890.250.200 – interferon alfa-2c
- MeSH D12.644.276.174.440.890.275 – interferon-beta
- MeSH D12.644.276.174.440.893 – interferon type ii
- MeSH D12.644.276.174.440.893.510 – interferon-gamma, recombinant
- MeSH D12.644.276.174.480 – lymphokines
- MeSH D12.644.276.174.480.350 – interferon type ii
- MeSH D12.644.276.174.480.372 – interleukin-2
- MeSH D12.644.276.174.480.428 – leukocyte migration-inhibitory factors
- MeSH D12.644.276.174.480.438 – lymphotoxin
- MeSH D12.644.276.174.480.615 – macrophage-activating factors
- MeSH D12.644.276.174.480.615.350 – interferon type ii
- MeSH D12.644.276.174.480.625 – macrophage migration-inhibitory factors
- MeSH D12.644.276.174.480.640 – neuroleukin
- MeSH D12.644.276.174.480.700 – suppressor factors, immunologic
- MeSH D12.644.276.174.480.750 – transfer factor
- MeSH D12.644.276.174.500 – monokines
- MeSH D12.644.276.174.500.400 – interleukin-1
- MeSH D12.644.276.174.500.800 – tumor necrosis factor-alpha
- MeSH D12.644.276.174.750 – tumor necrosis factors
- MeSH D12.644.276.174.750.500 – lymphotoxin
- MeSH D12.644.276.174.750.750 – tumor necrosis factor-alpha
- MeSH D12.644.276.211 – endothelial growth factors
- MeSH D12.644.276.249 – endothelins
- MeSH D12.644.276.249.225 – endothelin-1
- MeSH D12.644.276.249.235 – endothelin-2
- MeSH D12.644.276.249.245 – endothelin-3
- MeSH D12.644.276.500 – ephrins
- MeSH D12.644.276.500.100 – ephrin-A1
- MeSH D12.644.276.500.200 – ephrin-A2
- MeSH D12.644.276.500.300 – ephrin-A3
- MeSH D12.644.276.500.400 – ephrin-A4
- MeSH D12.644.276.500.500 – ephrin-A5
- MeSH D12.644.276.500.600 – ephrin-b1
- MeSH D12.644.276.500.700 – ephrin-b2
- MeSH D12.644.276.500.800 – ephrin-b3
- MeSH D12.644.276.625 – epidermal growth factor
- MeSH D12.644.276.750 – fibroblast growth factors
- MeSH D12.644.276.750.110 – fibroblast growth factor 1
- MeSH D12.644.276.750.120 – fibroblast growth factor 2
- MeSH D12.644.276.750.130 – fibroblast growth factor 3
- MeSH D12.644.276.750.140 – fibroblast growth factor 4
- MeSH D12.644.276.750.150 – fibroblast growth factor 5
- MeSH D12.644.276.750.160 – fibroblast growth factor 6
- MeSH D12.644.276.750.170 – fibroblast growth factor 7
- MeSH D12.644.276.750.180 – fibroblast growth factor 8
- MeSH D12.644.276.750.190 – fibroblast growth factor 9
- MeSH D12.644.276.750.200 – fibroblast growth factor 10
- MeSH D12.644.276.812 – i-kappa b kinase
- MeSH D12.644.276.875 – kinins
- MeSH D12.644.276.875.169 – bradykinin
- MeSH D12.644.276.875.169.400 – kallidin
- MeSH D12.644.276.875.654 – kininogens
- MeSH D12.644.276.875.654.350 – kininogen, high-molecular-weight
- MeSH D12.644.276.875.654.400 – kininogen, low-molecular-weight
- MeSH D12.644.276.875.900 – tachykinins
- MeSH D12.644.276.875.900.354 – eledoisin
- MeSH D12.644.276.875.900.475 – kassinin
- MeSH D12.644.276.875.900.500 – neurokinin a
- MeSH D12.644.276.875.900.550 – neurokinin b
- MeSH D12.644.276.875.900.800 – physalaemin
- MeSH D12.644.276.875.900.866 – substance p
- MeSH D12.644.276.937 – neuregulins
- MeSH D12.644.276.937.750 – neuregulin-1
- MeSH D12.644.276.952 – parathyroid hormone-related protein
- MeSH D12.644.276.968 – platelet-derived growth factor
- MeSH D12.644.276.968.650 – proto-oncogene proteins c-sis
- MeSH D12.644.276.976 – somatomedins
- MeSH D12.644.276.976.400 – insulin-like growth factor i
- MeSH D12.644.276.976.420 – insulin-like growth factor ii
- MeSH D12.644.276.984 – transforming growth factors
- MeSH D12.644.276.984.700 – transforming growth factor alpha
- MeSH D12.644.276.984.720 – transforming growth factor beta
- MeSH D12.644.276.992 – tumor necrosis factors
- MeSH D12.644.276.992.500 – lymphotoxin
- MeSH D12.644.276.992.750 – tumor necrosis factor-alpha
- MeSH D12.644.276.996 – wnt proteins
- MeSH D12.644.276.996.500 – wnt1 protein
- MeSH D12.644.276.996.750 – wnt2 protein

=== MeSH D12.644.360 – intracellular signaling peptides and proteins ===
- MeSH D12.644.360.011 – activating transcription factor 6
- MeSH D12.644.360.024 – adaptor proteins, signal transducing
- MeSH D12.644.360.024.264 – caveolin 1
- MeSH D12.644.360.024.272 – caveolin 2
- MeSH D12.644.360.024.280 – cortactin
- MeSH D12.644.360.024.295 – crk-associated substrate protein
- MeSH D12.644.360.024.297 – grb2 adaptor protein
- MeSH D12.644.360.024.298 – grb7 adaptor protein
- MeSH D12.644.360.024.300 – grb10 adaptor protein
- MeSH D12.644.360.024.301 – interferon-stimulated gene factor 3
- MeSH D12.644.360.024.301.500 – interferon-stimulated gene factor 3, alpha subunit
- MeSH D12.644.360.024.301.500.500 – stat1 transcription factor
- MeSH D12.644.360.024.301.500.750 – stat2 transcription factor
- MeSH D12.644.360.024.301.750 – interferon-stimulated gene factor 3, gamma subunit
- MeSH D12.644.360.024.303 – interferon regulatory factors
- MeSH D12.644.360.024.303.124 – interferon regulatory factor-1
- MeSH D12.644.360.024.303.249 – interferon regulatory factor-2
- MeSH D12.644.360.024.303.374 – interferon regulatory factor-3
- MeSH D12.644.360.024.303.437 – interferon regulatory factor-7
- MeSH D12.644.360.024.303.500 – interferon-stimulated gene factor 3, gamma subunit
- MeSH D12.644.360.024.305 – pii nitrogen regulatory proteins
- MeSH D12.644.360.024.307 – paxillin
- MeSH D12.644.360.024.311 – protein inhibitors of activated STAT
- MeSH D12.644.360.024.313 – 14-3-3 proteins
- MeSH D12.644.360.024.318 – proto-oncogene proteins c-crk
- MeSH D12.644.360.024.326 – proto-oncogene proteins c-vav
- MeSH D12.644.360.024.334 – smad proteins
- MeSH D12.644.360.024.334.200 – smad proteins, inhibitory
- MeSH D12.644.360.024.334.200.600 – smad6 protein
- MeSH D12.644.360.024.334.200.700 – smad7 protein
- MeSH D12.644.360.024.334.500 – smad proteins, receptor-regulated
- MeSH D12.644.360.024.334.500.100 – smad1 protein
- MeSH D12.644.360.024.334.500.200 – smad2 protein
- MeSH D12.644.360.024.334.500.300 – smad3 protein
- MeSH D12.644.360.024.334.500.500 – smad5 protein
- MeSH D12.644.360.024.334.500.800 – smad8 protein
- MeSH D12.644.360.024.334.750 – smad4 protein
- MeSH D12.644.360.024.342 – stat transcription factors
- MeSH D12.644.360.024.342.100 – stat1 transcription factor
- MeSH D12.644.360.024.342.200 – stat2 transcription factor
- MeSH D12.644.360.024.342.300 – stat3 transcription factor
- MeSH D12.644.360.024.342.400 – stat4 transcription factor
- MeSH D12.644.360.024.342.500 – stat5 transcription factor
- MeSH D12.644.360.024.342.600 – stat6 transcription factor
- MeSH D12.644.360.024.374 – suppressor of cytokine signaling proteins
- MeSH D12.644.360.024.500 – tumor necrosis factor receptor-associated peptides and proteins
- MeSH D12.644.360.024.500.500 – tnf receptor-associated factor 1
- MeSH D12.644.360.024.500.750 – tnf receptor-associated factor 2
- MeSH D12.644.360.024.500.875 – tnf receptor-associated factor 3
- MeSH D12.644.360.024.500.937 – tnf receptor-associated factor 5
- MeSH D12.644.360.024.500.968 – tnf receptor-associated factor 6
- MeSH D12.644.360.050 – adenylate cyclase
- MeSH D12.644.360.075 – apoptosis regulatory proteins
- MeSH D12.644.360.075.311 – apoptosis inducing factor
- MeSH D12.644.360.075.405 – caspases
- MeSH D12.644.360.075.405.200 – caspase 1
- MeSH D12.644.360.075.437 – inhibitor of apoptosis proteins
- MeSH D12.644.360.075.437.500 – neuronal apoptosis-inhibitory protein
- MeSH D12.644.360.075.437.750 – x-linked inhibitor of apoptosis protein
- MeSH D12.644.360.075.718 – proto-oncogene proteins c-bcl-2
- MeSH D12.644.360.075.718.100 – bcl-associated death protein
- MeSH D12.644.360.075.718.400 – bcl-2-associated x protein
- MeSH D12.644.360.075.718.750 – bcl-2 homologous antagonist-killer protein
- MeSH D12.644.360.075.718.937 – bcl-x protein
- MeSH D12.644.360.075.718.968 – bh3 interacting domain death agonist protein
- MeSH D12.644.360.100 – ca(2+)-calmodulin dependent protein kinase
- MeSH D12.644.360.100.500 – myosin-light-chain kinase
- MeSH D12.644.360.150 – casein kinases
- MeSH D12.644.360.150.300 – casein kinase i
- MeSH D12.644.360.150.300.100 – casein kinase ialpha
- MeSH D12.644.360.150.300.200 – casein kinase idelta
- MeSH D12.644.360.150.300.300 – casein kinase iepsilon
- MeSH D12.644.360.150.600 – casein kinase ii
- MeSH D12.644.360.200 – cyclic nucleotide-regulated protein kinases
- MeSH D12.644.360.200.125 – cyclic amp-dependent protein kinases
- MeSH D12.644.360.200.125.500 – beta-adrenergic receptor kinase
- MeSH D12.644.360.200.150 – cyclic gmp-dependent protein kinases
- MeSH D12.644.360.200.575 – protamine kinase
- MeSH D12.644.360.250 – cyclin-dependent kinases
- MeSH D12.644.360.250.067 – cdc2-cdc28 kinases
- MeSH D12.644.360.250.067.249 – cdc2 protein kinase
- MeSH D12.644.360.250.067.500 – cdc28 protein kinase, s cerevisiae
- MeSH D12.644.360.250.067.875 – cyclin-dependent kinase 5
- MeSH D12.644.360.250.067.900 – cyclin-dependent kinase 9
- MeSH D12.644.360.250.323 – cyclin-dependent kinase 2
- MeSH D12.644.360.250.451 – cyclin-dependent kinase 4
- MeSH D12.644.360.250.515 – cyclin-dependent kinase 6
- MeSH D12.644.360.250.580 – maturation-promoting factor
- MeSH D12.644.360.250.580.500 – cdc2 protein kinase
- MeSH D12.644.360.275 – eif-2 kinase
- MeSH D12.644.360.287 – focal adhesion protein-tyrosine kinases
- MeSH D12.644.360.300 – glycogen synthase kinases
- MeSH D12.644.360.300.500 – glycogen synthase kinase 3
- MeSH D12.644.360.325 – gtp-binding protein regulators
- MeSH D12.644.360.325.150 – gtpase-activating proteins
- MeSH D12.644.360.325.150.100 – chimerin proteins
- MeSH D12.644.360.325.150.100.200 – chimerin 1
- MeSH D12.644.360.325.150.300 – eukaryotic initiation factor-5
- MeSH D12.644.360.325.150.500 – ras gtpase-activating proteins
- MeSH D12.644.360.325.150.500.460 – neurofibromin 1
- MeSH D12.644.360.325.150.500.500 – p120 gtpase activating protein
- MeSH D12.644.360.325.150.750 – rgs proteins
- MeSH D12.644.360.325.225 – guanine nucleotide dissociation inhibitors
- MeSH D12.644.360.325.300 – guanine nucleotide exchange factors
- MeSH D12.644.360.325.300.200 – eukaryotic initiation factor-2b
- MeSH D12.644.360.325.300.300 – guanine nucleotide-releasing factor 2
- MeSH D12.644.360.325.300.450 – proto-oncogene proteins c-vav
- MeSH D12.644.360.325.300.600 – ral guanine nucleotide exchange factor
- MeSH D12.644.360.325.300.700 – ras guanine nucleotide exchange factors
- MeSH D12.644.360.325.300.700.500 – ras-grf1
- MeSH D12.644.360.325.300.700.700 – son of sevenless proteins
- MeSH D12.644.360.325.300.700.700.600 – son of sevenless protein, drosophila
- MeSH D12.644.360.325.300.700.700.630 – sos1 protein
- MeSH D12.644.360.350 – guanylate cyclase
- MeSH D12.644.360.375 – heterotrimeric gtp-binding proteins
- MeSH D12.644.360.375.100 – gtp-binding protein alpha subunits
- MeSH D12.644.360.375.100.100 – gtp-binding protein alpha subunits, g12-g13
- MeSH D12.644.360.375.100.200 – gtp-binding protein alpha subunits, gi-go
- MeSH D12.644.360.375.100.200.500 – gtp-binding protein alpha subunit, gi2
- MeSH D12.644.360.375.100.300 – gtp-binding protein alpha subunits, gq-g11
- MeSH D12.644.360.375.100.400 – gtp-binding protein alpha subunits, gs
- MeSH D12.644.360.375.520 – gtp-binding protein beta subunits
- MeSH D12.644.360.375.730 – gtp-binding protein gamma subunits
- MeSH D12.644.360.375.940 – transducin
- MeSH D12.644.360.376 – i-kappa b kinase
- MeSH D12.644.360.378 – i-kappa b proteins
- MeSH D12.644.360.381 – intracellular calcium-sensing proteins
- MeSH D12.644.360.381.249 – calmodulin
- MeSH D12.644.360.381.311 – calnexin
- MeSH D12.644.360.381.374 – calreticulin
- MeSH D12.644.360.381.437 – gelsolin
- MeSH D12.644.360.381.500 – neuronal calcium-sensor proteins
- MeSH D12.644.360.381.500.124 – guanylate cyclase-activating proteins
- MeSH D12.644.360.381.500.249 – hippocalcin
- MeSH D12.644.360.381.500.374 – Kv channel-interacting proteins
- MeSH D12.644.360.381.500.500 – neurocalcin
- MeSH D12.644.360.381.500.750 – recoverin
- MeSH D12.644.360.400 – map kinase kinase kinases
- MeSH D12.644.360.400.100 – map kinase kinase kinase 1
- MeSH D12.644.360.400.200 – map kinase kinase kinase 2
- MeSH D12.644.360.400.300 – map kinase kinase kinase 3
- MeSH D12.644.360.400.400 – map kinase kinase kinase 4
- MeSH D12.644.360.400.500 – map kinase kinase kinase 5
- MeSH D12.644.360.400.800 – proto-oncogene proteins c-mos
- MeSH D12.644.360.400.842 – raf kinases
- MeSH D12.644.360.400.842.249 – oncogene proteins v-raf
- MeSH D12.644.360.400.842.374 – proto-oncogene proteins b-raf
- MeSH D12.644.360.400.842.500 – proto-oncogene proteins c-raf
- MeSH D12.644.360.440 – mitogen-activated protein kinase kinases
- MeSH D12.644.360.440.100 – map kinase kinase 1
- MeSH D12.644.360.440.200 – map kinase kinase 2
- MeSH D12.644.360.440.300 – map kinase kinase 3
- MeSH D12.644.360.440.400 – map kinase kinase 4
- MeSH D12.644.360.440.500 – map kinase kinase 5
- MeSH D12.644.360.440.600 – map kinase kinase 6
- MeSH D12.644.360.440.700 – map kinase kinase 7
- MeSH D12.644.360.450 – mitogen-activated protein kinases
- MeSH D12.644.360.450.169 – extracellular signal-regulated map kinases
- MeSH D12.644.360.450.169.500 – mitogen-activated protein kinase 1
- MeSH D12.644.360.450.169.750 – mitogen-activated protein kinase 3
- MeSH D12.644.360.450.169.875 – mitogen-activated protein kinase 6
- MeSH D12.644.360.450.169.937 – mitogen-activated protein kinase 7
- MeSH D12.644.360.450.340 – jnk mitogen-activated protein kinases
- MeSH D12.644.360.450.340.500 – mitogen-activated protein kinase 8
- MeSH D12.644.360.450.340.750 – mitogen-activated protein kinase 9
- MeSH D12.644.360.450.340.800 – mitogen-activated protein kinase 10
- MeSH D12.644.360.450.835 – p38 mitogen-activated protein kinases
- MeSH D12.644.360.450.835.200 – mitogen-activated protein kinase 11
- MeSH D12.644.360.450.835.400 – mitogen-activated protein kinase 12
- MeSH D12.644.360.450.835.600 – mitogen-activated protein kinase 13
- MeSH D12.644.360.450.835.800 – mitogen-activated protein kinase 14
- MeSH D12.644.360.525 – monomeric gtp-binding proteins
- MeSH D12.644.360.525.100 – adp-ribosylation factors
- MeSH D12.644.360.525.100.100 – ADP-ribosylation factor 1
- MeSH D12.644.360.525.400 – rab gtp-binding proteins
- MeSH D12.644.360.525.400.025 – rab1 gtp-binding proteins
- MeSH D12.644.360.525.400.050 – rab2 gtp-binding protein
- MeSH D12.644.360.525.400.100 – rab3 gtp-binding proteins
- MeSH D12.644.360.525.400.100.100 – rab3a gtp-binding protein
- MeSH D12.644.360.525.400.150 – rab4 gtp-binding proteins
- MeSH D12.644.360.525.400.200 – rab5 gtp-binding proteins
- MeSH D12.644.360.525.450 – ral gtp-binding proteins
- MeSH D12.644.360.525.462 – ran gtp-binding protein
- MeSH D12.644.360.525.475 – rap gtp-binding proteins
- MeSH D12.644.360.525.475.100 – rap1 gtp-binding proteins
- MeSH D12.644.360.525.500 – ras proteins
- MeSH D12.644.360.525.500.300 – oncogene protein p21(ras)
- MeSH D12.644.360.525.500.600 – proto-oncogene proteins p21(ras)
- MeSH D12.644.360.525.700 – rho gtp-binding proteins
- MeSH D12.644.360.525.700.050 – cdc42 gtp-binding protein
- MeSH D12.644.360.525.700.050.500 – cdc42 gtp-binding protein, saccharomyces cerevisiae
- MeSH D12.644.360.525.700.100 – rac gtp-binding proteins
- MeSH D12.644.360.525.700.100.100 – rac1 gtp-binding protein
- MeSH D12.644.360.525.700.200 – rhoa gtp-binding protein
- MeSH D12.644.360.525.700.300 – rhob gtp-binding protein
- MeSH D12.644.360.543 – olfactory marker protein
- MeSH D12.644.360.562 – phosphatidylethanolamine binding protein
- MeSH D12.644.360.581 – phospholipase c gamma
- MeSH D12.644.360.600 – ribosomal protein s6 kinases
- MeSH D12.644.360.600.249 – ribosomal protein s6 kinases, 70-kda
- MeSH D12.644.360.600.500 – ribosomal protein s6 kinases, 90-kda

=== MeSH D12.644.400 – neuropeptides ===
- MeSH D12.644.400.070 – angiotensins
- MeSH D12.644.400.070.075 – angiotensin i
- MeSH D12.644.400.070.078 – angiotensin ii
- MeSH D12.644.400.070.080 – angiotensin iii
- MeSH D12.644.400.085 – bombesin
- MeSH D12.644.400.090 – bradykinin
- MeSH D12.644.400.095 – calcitonin
- MeSH D12.644.400.097 – calcitonin gene-related peptide
- MeSH D12.644.400.100 – carnosine
- MeSH D12.644.400.105 – cholecystokinin
- MeSH D12.644.400.120 – corticotropin
- MeSH D12.644.400.125 – corticotropin-releasing hormone
- MeSH D12.644.400.200 – delta sleep-inducing peptide
- MeSH D12.644.400.235 – fmrfamide
- MeSH D12.644.400.250 – galanin
- MeSH D12.644.400.275 – galanin-like peptide
- MeSH D12.644.400.300 – gastric inhibitory polypeptide
- MeSH D12.644.400.315 – gastrin-releasing peptide
- MeSH D12.644.400.320 – gastrins
- MeSH D12.644.400.340 – glucagon precursors
- MeSH D12.644.400.340.500 – glucagon
- MeSH D12.644.400.350 – gonadorelin
- MeSH D12.644.400.450 – motilin
- MeSH D12.644.400.460 – melanocyte-stimulating hormones
- MeSH D12.644.400.460.050 – alpha-msh
- MeSH D12.644.400.460.075 – beta-msh
- MeSH D12.644.400.460.115 – gamma-msh
- MeSH D12.644.400.465 – msh release-inhibiting hormone
- MeSH D12.644.400.470 – msh-releasing hormone
- MeSH D12.644.400.500 – neuropeptide y
- MeSH D12.644.400.525 – neurophysins
- MeSH D12.644.400.550 – neurotensin
- MeSH D12.644.400.575 – opioid peptides
- MeSH D12.644.400.575.180 – dynorphins
- MeSH D12.644.400.575.241 – endorphins
- MeSH D12.644.400.575.241.030 – alpha-endorphin
- MeSH D12.644.400.575.241.080 – beta-endorphin
- MeSH D12.644.400.575.241.360 – gamma-endorphin
- MeSH D12.644.400.575.281 – enkephalins
- MeSH D12.644.400.575.281.075 – enkephalin, ala(2)-mephe(4)-gly(5)-
- MeSH D12.644.400.575.281.231 – enkephalin, leucine
- MeSH D12.644.400.575.281.381 – enkephalin, methionine
- MeSH D12.644.400.575.281.600 – enkephalin, d-penicillamine (2,5)-
- MeSH D12.644.400.600 – pancreatic polypeptide
- MeSH D12.644.400.610 – peptide phi
- MeSH D12.644.400.625 – pituitary adenylate cyclase-activating polypeptide
- MeSH D12.644.400.640 – pituitary hormone release inhibiting hormones
- MeSH D12.644.400.645 – pituitary hormone-releasing hormones
- MeSH D12.644.400.680 – prolactin release-inhibiting hormone
- MeSH D12.644.400.700 – prolactin-releasing hormone
- MeSH D12.644.400.702 – thyrotropin-releasing hormone
- MeSH D12.644.400.705 – secretin
- MeSH D12.644.400.720 – somatostatin
- MeSH D12.644.400.740 – somatotropin-releasing hormone
- MeSH D12.644.400.800 – tachykinins
- MeSH D12.644.400.800.354 – eledoisin
- MeSH D12.644.400.800.475 – kassinin
- MeSH D12.644.400.800.500 – neurokinin a
- MeSH D12.644.400.800.550 – neurokinin b
- MeSH D12.644.400.800.625 – physalaemin
- MeSH D12.644.400.800.750 – substance p
- MeSH D12.644.400.875 – vasoactive intestinal peptide
- MeSH D12.644.400.900 – vasopressins
- MeSH D12.644.400.900.050 – argipressin
- MeSH D12.644.400.900.400 – lypressin
- MeSH D12.644.400.900.700 – oxytocin
- MeSH D12.644.400.900.900 – vasotocin

=== MeSH D12.644.456 – oligopeptides ===
- MeSH D12.644.456.050 – amanitins
- MeSH D12.644.456.073 – angiotensins
- MeSH D12.644.456.073.021 – angiotensin i
- MeSH D12.644.456.073.041 – angiotensin ii
- MeSH D12.644.456.073.041.050 – angiotensin amide
- MeSH D12.644.456.073.041.800 – saralasin
- MeSH D12.644.456.073.041.815 – 1-sarcosine-8-isoleucine angiotensin ii
- MeSH D12.644.456.073.055 – angiotensin iii
- MeSH D12.644.456.073.070 – angiotensinogen
- MeSH D12.644.456.120 – antipain
- MeSH D12.644.456.193 – bradykinin
- MeSH D12.644.456.193.400 – kallidin
- MeSH D12.644.456.241 – caerulein
- MeSH D12.644.456.270 – chalones
- MeSH D12.644.456.300 – delta sleep-inducing peptide
- MeSH D12.644.456.345 – dipeptides
- MeSH D12.644.456.345.159 – anserine
- MeSH D12.644.456.345.190 – aspartame
- MeSH D12.644.456.345.331 – carnosine
- MeSH D12.644.456.345.360 – enalapril
- MeSH D12.644.456.345.360.300 – enalaprilat
- MeSH D12.644.456.345.575 – glycylglycine
- MeSH D12.644.456.345.600 – lisinopril
- MeSH D12.644.456.400 – n-formylmethionine leucyl-phenylalanine
- MeSH D12.644.456.448 – glutathione
- MeSH D12.644.456.448.500 – glutathione disulfide
- MeSH D12.644.456.448.750 – s-nitrosoglutathione
- MeSH D12.644.456.460 – gonadorelin
- MeSH D12.644.456.460.150 – buserelin
- MeSH D12.644.456.460.315 – goserelin
- MeSH D12.644.456.460.480 – leuprolide
- MeSH D12.644.456.460.600 – nafarelin
- MeSH D12.644.456.460.800 – triptorelin
- MeSH D12.644.456.580 – leupeptins
- MeSH D12.644.456.650 – netropsin
- MeSH D12.644.456.716 – pentagastrin
- MeSH D12.644.456.724 – pepstatins
- MeSH D12.644.456.726 – peptichemio
- MeSH D12.644.456.729 – peptide t
- MeSH D12.644.456.735 – phalloidine
- MeSH D12.644.456.745 – thyrotropin-releasing hormone
- MeSH D12.644.456.800 – tachykinins
- MeSH D12.644.456.800.354 – eledoisin
- MeSH D12.644.456.800.475 – kassinin
- MeSH D12.644.456.800.500 – neurokinin a
- MeSH D12.644.456.800.550 – neurokinin b
- MeSH D12.644.456.800.745 – physalaemin
- MeSH D12.644.456.800.866 – substance p
- MeSH D12.644.456.805 – technetium tc 99m mertiatide
- MeSH D12.644.456.810 – teprotide
- MeSH D12.644.456.830 – tetragastrin
- MeSH D12.644.456.835 – thymic factor, circulating
- MeSH D12.644.456.840 – tuftsin
- MeSH D12.644.456.925 – vasopressins
- MeSH D12.644.456.925.100 – argipressin
- MeSH D12.644.456.925.100.250 – deamino arginine vasopressin
- MeSH D12.644.456.925.325 – felypressin
- MeSH D12.644.456.925.480 – lypressin
- MeSH D12.644.456.925.700 – ornipressin
- MeSH D12.644.456.925.730 – oxytocin
- MeSH D12.644.456.925.940 – vasotocin

=== MeSH D12.644.468 – opioid peptides ===
- MeSH D12.644.468.180 – dynorphins
- MeSH D12.644.468.241 – endorphins
- MeSH D12.644.468.241.030 – alpha-endorphin
- MeSH D12.644.468.241.080 – beta-endorphin
- MeSH D12.644.468.241.360 – gamma-endorphin
- MeSH D12.644.468.281 – enkephalins
- MeSH D12.644.468.281.075 – enkephalin, ala(2)-mephe(4)-gly(5)-
- MeSH D12.644.468.281.231 – enkephalin, leucine
- MeSH D12.644.468.281.231.300 – enkephalin, leucine-2-alanine
- MeSH D12.644.468.281.381 – enkephalin, methionine
- MeSH D12.644.468.281.381.300 – d-ala(2),mephe(4),met(0)-ol-enkephalin
- MeSH D12.644.468.281.600 – enkephalin, d-penicillamine (2,5)-

=== MeSH D12.644.548 – peptide hormones ===
- MeSH D12.644.548.009 – activins
- MeSH D12.644.548.009.500 – inhibin-beta subunits
- MeSH D12.644.548.014 – adiponectin
- MeSH D12.644.548.020 – atrial natriuretic factor
- MeSH D12.644.548.100 – bombesin
- MeSH D12.644.548.150 – calcitonin
- MeSH D12.644.548.200 – corticotropin-releasing hormone
- MeSH D12.644.548.275 – gastric inhibitory polypeptide
- MeSH D12.644.548.280 – gastrins
- MeSH D12.644.548.343 – glucagon precursors
- MeSH D12.644.548.343.249 – enteroglucagons
- MeSH D12.644.548.343.249.500 – glucagon-like peptide 1
- MeSH D12.644.548.343.500 – glucagon
- MeSH D12.644.548.387 – inhibins
- MeSH D12.644.548.387.500 – inhibin-beta subunits
- MeSH D12.644.548.393 – insulin
- MeSH D12.644.548.393.408 – insulin, isophane
- MeSH D12.644.548.393.532 – insulin, long-acting
- MeSH D12.644.548.393.788 – proinsulin
- MeSH D12.644.548.393.788.250 – c-peptide
- MeSH D12.644.548.400 – leptin
- MeSH D12.644.548.500 – motilin
- MeSH D12.644.548.560 – msh release-inhibiting hormone
- MeSH D12.644.548.580 – msh-releasing hormone
- MeSH D12.644.548.585 – natriuretic peptide, c-type
- MeSH D12.644.548.587 – pancreatic polypeptide
- MeSH D12.644.548.588 – parathyroid hormone-related protein
- MeSH D12.644.548.590 – parathyroid hormone
- MeSH D12.644.548.590.850 – teriparatide
- MeSH D12.644.548.592 – peptide phi
- MeSH D12.644.548.595 – peptide yy
- MeSH D12.644.548.600 – pituitary hormone release inhibiting hormones
- MeSH D12.644.548.620 – pituitary hormone-releasing hormones
- MeSH D12.644.548.691 – pituitary hormones
- MeSH D12.644.548.691.525 – pituitary hormones, anterior
- MeSH D12.644.548.691.525.343 – gonadotropins, pituitary
- MeSH D12.644.548.691.525.343.288 – follicle stimulating hormone
- MeSH D12.644.548.691.525.343.288.500 – follicle stimulating hormone, beta subunit
- MeSH D12.644.548.691.525.343.288.750 – glycoprotein hormones, alpha subunit
- MeSH D12.644.548.691.525.343.463 – luteinizing hormone
- MeSH D12.644.548.691.525.343.463.249 – glycoprotein hormones, alpha subunit
- MeSH D12.644.548.691.525.343.463.500 – luteinizing hormone, beta subunit
- MeSH D12.644.548.691.525.343.583 – menotropins
- MeSH D12.644.548.691.525.343.583.500 – urofollitropin
- MeSH D12.644.548.691.525.425 – growth hormone
- MeSH D12.644.548.691.525.425.875 – human growth hormone
- MeSH D12.644.548.691.525.525 – prolactin
- MeSH D12.644.548.691.525.690 – pro-opiomelanocortin
- MeSH D12.644.548.691.525.690.130 – corticotropin
- MeSH D12.644.548.691.525.690.130.050 – alpha-msh
- MeSH D12.644.548.691.525.690.130.200 – cosyntropin
- MeSH D12.644.548.691.525.690.480 – lipotropin
- MeSH D12.644.548.691.525.690.583 – melanocyte-stimulating hormones
- MeSH D12.644.548.691.525.690.583.050 – alpha-msh
- MeSH D12.644.548.691.525.690.583.075 – beta-msh
- MeSH D12.644.548.691.525.690.583.115 – gamma-msh
- MeSH D12.644.548.691.525.883 – thyrotropin
- MeSH D12.644.548.691.525.883.249 – glycoprotein hormones, alpha subunit
- MeSH D12.644.548.691.525.883.500 – thyrotropin, beta subunit
- MeSH D12.644.548.691.692 – pituitary hormones, posterior
- MeSH D12.644.548.691.692.433 – oxytocin
- MeSH D12.644.548.691.692.781 – vasopressins
- MeSH D12.644.548.691.692.781.100 – argipressin
- MeSH D12.644.548.691.692.781.100.250 – deamino arginine vasopressin
- MeSH D12.644.548.691.692.781.400 – lypressin
- MeSH D12.644.548.691.692.781.400.350 – felypressin
- MeSH D12.644.548.691.692.781.700 – ornipressin
- MeSH D12.644.548.691.692.881 – vasotocin
- MeSH D12.644.548.726 – placental hormones
- MeSH D12.644.548.726.367 – chorionic gonadotropin
- MeSH D12.644.548.726.367.125 – chorionic gonadotropin, beta subunit, human
- MeSH D12.644.548.726.367.562 – glycoprotein hormones, alpha subunit
- MeSH D12.644.548.726.451 – gonadotropins, equine
- MeSH D12.644.548.726.692 – placental lactogen
- MeSH D12.644.548.762 – relaxin
- MeSH D12.644.548.786 – resistin
- MeSH D12.644.548.810 – secretin
- MeSH D12.644.548.857 – somatostatin
- MeSH D12.644.548.869 – thymosin
- MeSH D12.644.548.905 – urotensins
- MeSH D12.644.548.952 – vasoactive intestinal peptide

=== MeSH D12.644.641 – peptides, cyclic ===
- MeSH D12.644.641.040 – alamethicin
- MeSH D12.644.641.050 – amanitins
- MeSH D12.644.641.075 – bacitracin
- MeSH D12.644.641.142 – capreomycin sulfate
- MeSH D12.644.641.235 – cyclosporins
- MeSH D12.644.641.235.300 – cyclosporine
- MeSH D12.644.641.243 – cyclotides
- MeSH D12.644.641.252 – dactinomycin
- MeSH D12.644.641.270 – daptomycin
- MeSH D12.644.641.297 – depsipeptides
- MeSH D12.644.641.297.500 – valinomycin
- MeSH D12.644.641.325 – echinomycin
- MeSH D12.644.641.380 – ferrichrome
- MeSH D12.644.641.515 – mycobacillin
- MeSH D12.644.641.548 – nanotubes, peptide
- MeSH D12.644.641.582 – nisin
- MeSH D12.644.641.650 – octreotide
- MeSH D12.644.641.735 – phalloidine
- MeSH D12.644.641.780 – polymyxins
- MeSH D12.644.641.780.110 – colistin
- MeSH D12.644.641.780.750 – polymyxin b
- MeSH D12.644.641.802 – streptogramins
- MeSH D12.644.641.802.249 – mikamycin
- MeSH D12.644.641.802.374 – pristinamycin
- MeSH D12.644.641.802.500 – streptogramin group a
- MeSH D12.644.641.802.500.500 – streptogramin a
- MeSH D12.644.641.802.750 – streptogramin group b
- MeSH D12.644.641.802.750.500 – streptogramin b
- MeSH D12.644.641.802.812 – vernamycin b
- MeSH D12.644.641.802.875 – virginiamycin
- MeSH D12.644.641.802.875.500 – streptogramin a
- MeSH D12.644.641.825 – thiostrepton
- MeSH D12.644.641.875 – viomycin
- MeSH D12.644.641.875.250 – enviomycin

=== MeSH D12.644.679 – peptoids ===
- MeSH D12.644.679.500 – n-substituted glycines

=== MeSH D12.644.770 – protein sorting signals ===
- MeSH D12.644.770.600 – nuclear export signals
- MeSH D12.644.770.610 – nuclear localization signals

=== MeSH D12.644.905 – tyrothricin ===
- MeSH D12.644.905.300 – gramicidin
- MeSH D12.644.905.920 – tyrocidine

The list continues at List of MeSH codes (D12.776).
