= List of MeSH codes (D12.776.641) =

The following is a partial list of the "D" codes for Medical Subject Headings (MeSH), as defined by the United States National Library of Medicine (NLM).

This list covers nerve tissue proteins. For other protein-related codes, see List of MeSH codes (D12.776).

Codes before these are found at List of MeSH codes (D12.776) § MeSH D12.776.624.776.960. Codes following these are found at List of MeSH codes (D12.776.660). For other MeSH codes, see List of MeSH codes.

The source for this content is the set of 2006 MeSH Trees from the NLM.

== MeSH D12.776.641 – nerve tissue proteins ==
=== MeSH D12.776.641.580 – myelin proteins ===
==== MeSH D12.776.641.580.510 – myelin basic proteins ====
- MeSH D12.776.641.580.510.500 – myelin p2 protein

=== MeSH D12.776.641.600 – nerve growth factors ===
==== MeSH D12.776.641.600.381 – glial cell line-derived neurotrophic factors ====
- MeSH D12.776.641.600.381.500 – glial cell line-derived neurotrophic factor
- MeSH D12.776.641.600.381.750 – neurturin

==== MeSH D12.776.641.600.550 – neuregulins ====
- MeSH D12.776.641.600.550.750 – neuregulin-1

=== MeSH D12.776.641.650 – neuropeptides ===
==== MeSH D12.776.641.650.070 – angiotensins ====
- MeSH D12.776.641.650.070.075 – angiotensin i
- MeSH D12.776.641.650.070.078 – angiotensin ii
- MeSH D12.776.641.650.070.080 – angiotensin iii

==== MeSH D12.776.641.650.340 – glucagon precursors ====
- MeSH D12.776.641.650.340.500 – glucagon

==== MeSH D12.776.641.650.460 – melanocyte-stimulating hormones ====
- MeSH D12.776.641.650.460.050 – alpha-msh
- MeSH D12.776.641.650.460.075 – beta-msh
- MeSH D12.776.641.650.460.115 – gamma-msh

==== MeSH D12.776.641.650.575 – opioid peptides ====
- MeSH D12.776.641.650.575.180 – dynorphins
- MeSH D12.776.641.650.575.241 – endorphins
- MeSH D12.776.641.650.575.241.030 – alpha-endorphin
- MeSH D12.776.641.650.575.241.080 – beta-endorphin
- MeSH D12.776.641.650.575.241.360 – gamma-endorphin
- MeSH D12.776.641.650.575.281 – enkephalins
- MeSH D12.776.641.650.575.281.075 – enkephalin, ala(2)-mephe(4)-gly(5)-
- MeSH D12.776.641.650.575.281.231 – enkephalin, leucine
- MeSH D12.776.641.650.575.281.381 – enkephalin, methionine
- MeSH D12.776.641.650.575.281.600 – enkephalin, d-penicillamine (2,5)-

==== MeSH D12.776.641.650.800 – tachykinins ====
- MeSH D12.776.641.650.800.354 – eledoisin
- MeSH D12.776.641.650.800.475 – kassinin
- MeSH D12.776.641.650.800.500 – neurokinin a
- MeSH D12.776.641.650.800.550 – neurokinin b
- MeSH D12.776.641.650.800.625 – physalaemin
- MeSH D12.776.641.650.800.750 – substance p

==== MeSH D12.776.641.650.900 – vasopressins ====
- MeSH D12.776.641.650.900.050 – argipressin
- MeSH D12.776.641.650.900.400 – lypressin
- MeSH D12.776.641.650.900.700 – oxytocin
- MeSH D12.776.641.650.900.900 – vasotocin

=== MeSH D12.776.641.655 – s100 proteins ===
==== MeSH D12.776.641.655.500 – leukocyte L1 antigen complex ====
- MeSH D12.776.641.655.500.100 – calgranulin a
- MeSH D12.776.641.655.500.200 – calgranulin b

=== MeSH D12.776.641.920 – tubulin ===
The list continues at List of MeSH codes (D12.776.660).
