= List of MeSH codes (D12.776.476) =

The following is a partial list of the "D" codes for Medical Subject Headings (MeSH), as defined by the United States National Library of Medicine (NLM).

This list covers intracellular signaling peptides and proteins. For other protein-related codes, see List of MeSH codes (D12.776).

Codes before these are found at List of MeSH codes (D12.776) § MeSH D12.776.467.984.750. Codes following these are found at List of MeSH codes (D12.776) § MeSH D12.776.486. For other MeSH codes, see List of MeSH codes.

The source for this content is the set of 2006 MeSH Trees from the NLM.

== MeSH D12.776.476 – intracellular signaling peptides and proteins ==
=== MeSH D12.776.476.024 – adaptor proteins, signal transducing ===
==== MeSH D12.776.476.024.381 – interferon-stimulated gene factor 3 ====
- MeSH D12.776.476.024.381.500 – interferon-stimulated gene factor 3, alpha subunit
- MeSH D12.776.476.024.381.500.500 – stat1 transcription factor
- MeSH D12.776.476.024.381.500.750 – stat2 transcription factor
- MeSH D12.776.476.024.381.750 – interferon-stimulated gene factor 3, gamma subunit

==== MeSH D12.776.476.024.389 – interferon regulatory factors ====
- MeSH D12.776.476.024.389.124 – interferon regulatory factor-1
- MeSH D12.776.476.024.389.249 – interferon regulatory factor-2
- MeSH D12.776.476.024.389.374 – interferon regulatory factor-3
- MeSH D12.776.476.024.389.437 – interferon regulatory factor-7
- MeSH D12.776.476.024.389.500 – interferon-stimulated gene factor 3, gamma subunit

==== MeSH D12.776.476.024.417 – smad proteins ====
- MeSH D12.776.476.024.417.249 – smad proteins, inhibitory
- MeSH D12.776.476.024.417.249.600 – smad6 protein
- MeSH D12.776.476.024.417.249.700 – smad7 protein
- MeSH D12.776.476.024.417.500 – smad proteins, receptor-regulated
- MeSH D12.776.476.024.417.500.100 – smad1 protein
- MeSH D12.776.476.024.417.500.200 – smad2 protein
- MeSH D12.776.476.024.417.500.300 – smad3 protein
- MeSH D12.776.476.024.417.500.500 – smad5 protein
- MeSH D12.776.476.024.417.500.800 – smad8 protein
- MeSH D12.776.476.024.417.750 – smad4 protein

==== MeSH D12.776.476.024.421 – stat transcription factors ====
- MeSH D12.776.476.024.421.100 – stat1 transcription factor
- MeSH D12.776.476.024.421.200 – stat2 transcription factor
- MeSH D12.776.476.024.421.300 – stat3 transcription factor
- MeSH D12.776.476.024.421.400 – stat4 transcription factor
- MeSH D12.776.476.024.421.500 – stat5 transcription factor
- MeSH D12.776.476.024.421.600 – stat6 transcription factor

==== MeSH D12.776.476.024.500 – tumor necrosis factor receptor-associated peptides and proteins ====
- MeSH D12.776.476.024.500.500 – tnf receptor-associated factor 1
- MeSH D12.776.476.024.500.750 – tnf receptor-associated factor 2
- MeSH D12.776.476.024.500.875 – tnf receptor-associated factor 3
- MeSH D12.776.476.024.500.937 – tnf receptor-associated factor 5
- MeSH D12.776.476.024.500.968 – tnf receptor-associated factor 6

=== MeSH D12.776.476.075 – apoptosis regulatory proteins ===
==== MeSH D12.776.476.075.405 – caspases ====
- MeSH D12.776.476.075.405.200 – caspase 1

==== MeSH D12.776.476.075.437 – inhibitor of apoptosis proteins ====
- MeSH D12.776.476.075.437.500 – neuronal apoptosis-inhibitory protein
- MeSH D12.776.476.075.437.750 – x-linked inhibitor of apoptosis protein

==== MeSH D12.776.476.075.718 – proto-oncogene proteins c-bcl-2 ====
- MeSH D12.776.476.075.718.100 – bcl-associated death protein
- MeSH D12.776.476.075.718.400 – bcl-2-associated x protein
- MeSH D12.776.476.075.718.425 – bcl-2 homologous antagonist-killer protein
- MeSH D12.776.476.075.718.875 – bcl-x protein
- MeSH D12.776.476.075.718.937 – bh3 interacting domain death agonist protein

=== MeSH D12.776.476.150 – casein kinases ===
==== MeSH D12.776.476.150.300 – casein kinase i ====
- MeSH D12.776.476.150.300.100 – casein kinase ialpha
- MeSH D12.776.476.150.300.200 – casein kinase idelta
- MeSH D12.776.476.150.300.300 – casein kinase iepsilon

=== MeSH D12.776.476.200 – cyclic nucleotide-regulated protein kinases ===
==== MeSH D12.776.476.200.125 – cyclic amp-dependent protein kinases ====
- MeSH D12.776.476.200.125.500 – beta-adrenergic receptor kinase

=== MeSH D12.776.476.250 – cyclin-dependent kinases ===
==== MeSH D12.776.476.250.067 – cdc2-cdc28 kinases ====
- MeSH D12.776.476.250.067.249 – cdc2 protein kinase
- MeSH D12.776.476.250.067.500 – cdc28 protein kinase, s cerevisiae
- MeSH D12.776.476.250.067.875 – cyclin-dependent kinase 5
- MeSH D12.776.476.250.067.900 – cyclin-dependent kinase 9

==== MeSH D12.776.476.250.580 – maturation-promoting factor ====
- MeSH D12.776.476.250.580.500 – cdc2 protein kinase

=== MeSH D12.776.476.325 – gtp-binding protein regulators ===
==== MeSH D12.776.476.325.150 – gtpase-activating proteins ====
- MeSH D12.776.476.325.150.100 – chimerin proteins
- MeSH D12.776.476.325.150.100.200 – chimerin 1
- MeSH D12.776.476.325.150.300 – eukaryotic initiation factor-5
- MeSH D12.776.476.325.150.500 – ras gtpase-activating proteins
- MeSH D12.776.476.325.150.500.460 – neurofibromin 1
- MeSH D12.776.476.325.150.500.500 – p120 gtpase activating protein
- MeSH D12.776.476.325.150.750 – rgs proteins

==== MeSH D12.776.476.325.300 – guanine nucleotide exchange factors ====
- MeSH D12.776.476.325.300.200 – eukaryotic initiation factor-2b
- MeSH D12.776.476.325.300.300 – guanine nucleotide-releasing factor 2
- MeSH D12.776.476.325.300.450 – proto-oncogene proteins c-vav
- MeSH D12.776.476.325.300.600 – ral guanine nucleotide exchange factor
- MeSH D12.776.476.325.300.700 – ras guanine nucleotide exchange factors
- MeSH D12.776.476.325.300.700.500 – ras-grf1
- MeSH D12.776.476.325.300.700.700 – son of sevenless proteins
- MeSH D12.776.476.325.300.700.700.600 – son of sevenless protein, drosophila
- MeSH D12.776.476.325.300.700.700.630 – sos1 protein

=== MeSH D12.776.476.375 – heterotrimeric gtp-binding proteins ===
==== MeSH D12.776.476.375.100 – gtp-binding protein alpha subunits ====
- MeSH D12.776.476.375.100.100 – gtp-binding protein alpha subunits, g12-g13
- MeSH D12.776.476.375.100.200 – gtp-binding protein alpha subunits, gi-go
- MeSH D12.776.476.375.100.200.500 – gtp-binding protein alpha subunit, gi2
- MeSH D12.776.476.375.100.300 – gtp-binding protein alpha subunits, gq-g11
- MeSH D12.776.476.375.100.400 – gtp-binding protein alpha subunits, gs

=== MeSH D12.776.476.387 – intracellular calcium-sensing proteins ===
==== MeSH D12.776.476.387.500 – neuronal calcium-sensor proteins ====
- MeSH D12.776.476.387.500.124 – guanylate cyclase-activating proteins
- MeSH D12.776.476.387.500.249 – hippocalcin
- MeSH D12.776.476.387.500.374 – Kv channel-interacting proteins
- MeSH D12.776.476.387.500.500 – neurocalcin
- MeSH D12.776.476.387.500.750 – recoverin

=== MeSH D12.776.476.400 – map kinase kinase kinases ===
==== MeSH D12.776.476.400.842 – raf kinases ====
- MeSH D12.776.476.400.842.249 – oncogene proteins v-raf
- MeSH D12.776.476.400.842.374 – proto-oncogene proteins a-raf
- MeSH D12.776.476.400.842.437 – proto-oncogene proteins b-raf
- MeSH D12.776.476.400.842.500 – proto-oncogene proteins c-raf

=== MeSH D12.776.476.450 – mitogen-activated protein kinases ===
==== MeSH D12.776.476.450.169 – extracellular signal-regulated map kinases ====
- MeSH D12.776.476.450.169.500 – mitogen-activated protein kinase 1
- MeSH D12.776.476.450.169.750 – mitogen-activated protein kinase 3
- MeSH D12.776.476.450.169.875 – mitogen-activated protein kinase 6
- MeSH D12.776.476.450.169.937 – mitogen-activated protein kinase 7

==== MeSH D12.776.476.450.340 – jnk mitogen-activated protein kinases ====
- MeSH D12.776.476.450.340.500 – mitogen-activated protein kinase 8
- MeSH D12.776.476.450.340.750 – mitogen-activated protein kinase 9
- MeSH D12.776.476.450.340.800 – mitogen-activated protein kinase 10

=== MeSH D12.776.476.525 – monomeric gtp-binding proteins ===
==== MeSH D12.776.476.525.100 – adp-ribosylation factors ====
- MeSH D12.776.476.525.100.100 – adp-ribosylation factor 1

==== MeSH D12.776.476.525.400 – rab gtp-binding proteins ====
- MeSH D12.776.476.525.400.025 – rab1 gtp-binding proteins
- MeSH D12.776.476.525.400.050 – rab2 gtp-binding protein
- MeSH D12.776.476.525.400.100 – rab3 gtp-binding proteins
- MeSH D12.776.476.525.400.100.100 – rab3a gtp-binding protein
- MeSH D12.776.476.525.400.150 – rab4 gtp-binding proteins
- MeSH D12.776.476.525.400.200 – rab5 gtp-binding proteins

==== MeSH D12.776.476.525.475 – rap gtp-binding proteins ====
- MeSH D12.776.476.525.475.100 – rap1 gtp-binding proteins

==== MeSH D12.776.476.525.500 – ras proteins ====
- MeSH D12.776.476.525.500.300 – oncogene protein p21(ras)
- MeSH D12.776.476.525.500.600 – proto-oncogene proteins p21(ras)

==== MeSH D12.776.476.525.700 – rho gtp-binding proteins ====
- MeSH D12.776.476.525.700.050 – cdc42 gtp-binding protein
- MeSH D12.776.476.525.700.050.500 – cdc42 gtp-binding protein in saccharomyces cerevisiae
- MeSH D12.776.476.525.700.100 – rac gtp-binding proteins
- MeSH D12.776.476.525.700.100.100 – rac1 gtp-binding protein
- MeSH D12.776.476.525.700.200 – rhoa gtp-binding protein
- MeSH D12.776.476.525.700.300 – rhob gtp-binding protein

=== MeSH D12.776.476.600 – ribosomal protein s6 kinases ===
==== MeSH D12.776.476.600.500 – ribosomal protein s6 kinases, 90-kda ====
The list continues at List of MeSH codes (D12.776) § MeSH D12.776.486.
