= List of MeSH codes (D12.776.660) =

The following is a partial list of the "D" codes for Medical Subject Headings (MeSH), as defined by the United States National Library of Medicine (NLM).

This list covers nuclear proteins. For other protein-related codes, see List of MeSH codes (D12.776).

Codes before these are found at List of MeSH codes (D12.776.641). Codes following these are found at List of MeSH codes (D12.776) § MeSH D12.776.664. For other MeSH codes, see List of MeSH codes.

The source for this content is the set of 2006 MeSH Trees from the NLM.

== MeSH D12.776.660 – nuclear proteins ==
=== MeSH D12.776.660.235 – chromosomal proteins, non-histone ===
==== MeSH D12.776.660.235.400 – high mobility group proteins ====
- MeSH D12.776.660.235.400.400 – hmgn proteins
- MeSH D12.776.660.235.400.400.200 – hmgn1 protein
- MeSH D12.776.660.235.400.400.300 – hmgn2 protein
- MeSH D12.776.660.235.400.500 – hmga proteins
- MeSH D12.776.660.235.400.500.100 – hmga1a protein
- MeSH D12.776.660.235.400.500.200 – hmga1b protein
- MeSH D12.776.660.235.400.500.400 – hmga1c protein
- MeSH D12.776.660.235.400.500.600 – hmga2 protein
- MeSH D12.776.660.235.400.600 – hmgb proteins
- MeSH D12.776.660.235.400.600.300 – hmgb1 protein
- MeSH D12.776.660.235.400.600.600 – hmgb2 protein
- MeSH D12.776.660.235.400.600.800 – hmgb3 protein
- MeSH D12.776.660.235.400.700 – sex-determining region y protein
- MeSH D12.776.660.235.400.800 – tcf transcription factors
- MeSH D12.776.660.235.400.800.500 – lymphoid enhancer-binding factor 1
- MeSH D12.776.660.235.400.800.750 – t cell transcription factor 1

==== MeSH D12.776.660.235.700 – telomere-binding proteins ====
- MeSH D12.776.660.235.700.500 – heterogeneous-nuclear ribonucleoprotein group a-b
- MeSH D12.776.660.235.700.750 – telomeric repeat binding protein 1
- MeSH D12.776.660.235.700.875 – telomeric repeat binding protein 2

=== MeSH D12.776.660.352 – hepatocyte nuclear factors ===
==== MeSH D12.776.660.352.500 – hepatocyte nuclear factor 1 ====
- MeSH D12.776.660.352.500.500 – hepatocyte nuclear factor 1-alpha
- MeSH D12.776.660.352.500.750 – hepatocyte nuclear factor 1-beta

=== MeSH D12.776.660.650 – nuclear matrix-associated proteins ===
==== MeSH D12.776.660.650.875 – lamins ====
- MeSH D12.776.660.650.875.500 – lamin type a
- MeSH D12.776.660.650.875.750 – lamin type b

=== MeSH D12.776.660.825 – tumor suppressor protein p53 ===
The list continues at List of MeSH codes (D12.776) § MeSH D12.776.664.
