= Myocardial depressant factor =

Pancreatic peptide released in shock

Myocardial depressant factor (MDF) or Myocardial Toxic factor (MTF) is a low-molecular-weight peptide released from the pancreas into the blood in mammals during various shock states.

MDF is a significant mediator of shock pathophysiology, reducing myocardial contractility, constricting splanchnic arteries and impairing phagocytosis by the reticuloendothelial system. Survival can be improved by preventing its release or blocking its activity, for example using glucocorticoids, prostaglandins, aprotinin, captopril, imidazole or lidocaine.
