= Jelleine =

Family of peptides

Jelleine is a family of peptides, isolated from the royal jelly of Apis mellifera iberiensis, a subspecies of the honey bee. This new family has the potential to be used in the development of new drugs.

== Discovery ==
Jelleines were first isolated in 2004 by the research group of Professor Mario Sergio Palma at São Paulo State University, Brazil. First, he collected royal jelly from a group of honey bee larvae and purified the results by reverse phase, high-performance liquid chromatography. This purified royal jelly showed antimicrobial activity against different bacteria. So far, four peptides have been found in this family, each one containing the carboxamide C-terminal.

== Medical research ==
Jelleine exhibits antimicrobial activity against S. epidermidis.
