= Ribosomal s6 kinase =

Family of protein kinases

Some of the signalling events involving rsk.

In molecular biology, ribosomal s6 kinase (rsk) is a family of protein kinases involved in signal transduction. There are two subfamilies of rsk, p90^{rsk}, also known as MAPK-activated protein kinase-1 (MAPKAP-K1), and p70^{rsk}, also known as S6-H1 Kinase or simply S6 Kinase. There are three variants of p90^{rsk} in humans, rsk 1-3. Rsks are serine/threonine kinases and are activated by the MAPK/ERK pathway. There are two known mammalian homologues of S6 Kinase: S6K1 and S6K2.

== Substrates ==
Both p90 and p70 Rsk phosphorylate ribosomal protein s6, part of the translational machinery, but several other substrates have been identified, including other ribosomal proteins. Cytosolic substrates of p90^{rsk} include protein phosphatase 1; glycogen synthase kinase 3 (GSK3); L1 CAM, a neural cell adhesion molecule; Son of Sevenless, the Ras exchange factor; and Myt1, an inhibitor of cdc2.

RSK phosphorylation of SOS1 (Son of Sevenless) at Serines 1134 and 1161 creates 14-3-3 docking site. This interaction of phospho SOS1 and 14-3-3 negatively regulates Ras-MAPK pathway.

p90^{rsk} also regulates transcription factors including cAMP response element-binding protein (CREB); estrogen receptor-α (ERα); IκBα/NF-κB; and c-Fos.

== Genomics ==
p90 Rsk-1 is located at 1p.

p90 Rsk-2 is located at Xp22.2 and contains 22 exons. Mutations in this gene have been associated with Coffin–Lowry syndrome, a disease characterised by severe psychomotor retardation and other developmental abnormalities.

p90 Rsk-3 is located at 6q27.

== Proteomics ==
The main distinguishing feature between p90^{rsk} and p70^{rsk} is that the 90 kDa family contain two non-identical kinase domains, while the 70 kDa family contain only one kinase domain.

Domain structure of rsk. Numbers refer to amino acid residues of p90 rsk-1 from rat.

== Research history ==
Rsk was first identified in Xenopus laevis eggs by Erikson and Maller in 1985.
