= Eledoisin =

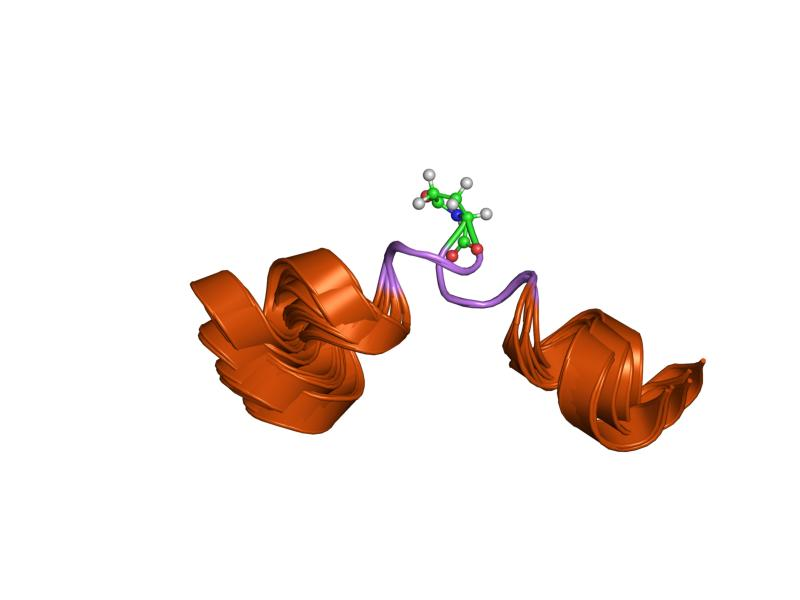

Names
- IUPAC name (3S)-3-[[(2S)-6-amino-2-[[(2S)-3-hydroxy-2-[[(2S)-1-[(2S)-5-oxopyrrolidine-2-carbonyl]pyrrolidine-2-carbonyl]amino]propanoyl]amino]hexanoyl]amino]-4-[[(2S)-1-[[(2S)-1-[[(2S,3S)-1-[[2-[[(2S)-1-[[(2S)-1-amino-4-methylsulfanyl-1-oxobutan-2-yl]amino]-4-methyl-1-oxopentan-2-yl]amino]-2-oxoethyl]amino]-3-methyl-1-oxopentan-2-yl]amino]-1-oxo-3-phenylpropan-2-yl]amino]-1-oxopropan-2-yl]amino]-4-oxobutanoic acid

Identifiers
CAS Number	69-25-0
3D model (JSmol)	Interactive image
ChEBI	CHEBI:135903
ChEMBL	ChEMBL373569
ChemSpider	6006
IUPHAR/BPS	2086
KEGG	C20029; D07936
PubChem CID	10328936
UNII	OKY3285J18
CompTox Dashboard (EPA)	DTXSID1046926
- InChI: InChI=1S/C54H85N13O15S/c1-7-30(4)44(53(81)57-27-42(70)60-36(24-29(2)3)49(77)61-33(45(56)73)20-23-83-6)66-50(78)37(25-32-14-9-8-10-15-32)63-46(74)31(5)58-48(76)38(26-43(71)72)64-47(75)34(16-11-12-21-55)62-51(79)39(28-68)65-52(80)40-17-13-22-67(40)54(82)35-18-19-41(69)59-35/h8-10,14-15,29-31,33-40,44,68H,7,11-13,16-28,55H2,1-6H3,(H2,56,73)(H,57,81)(H,58,76)(H,59,69)(H,60,70)(H,61,77)(H,62,79)(H,63,74)(H,64,75)(H,65,80)(H,66,78)(H,71,72)/t30-,31-,33-,34-,35-,36-,37-,38-,39-,40-,44-/m0/s1 Key: AYLPVIWBPZMVSH-FCKMLYJASA-N; InChI=1/C54H85N13O15S/c1-7-30(4)44(53(81)57-27-42(70)60-36(24-29(2)3)49(77)61-33(45(56)73)20-23-83-6)66-50(78)37(25-32-14-9-8-10-15-32)63-46(74)31(5)58-48(76)38(26-43(71)72)64-47(75)34(16-11-12-21-55)62-51(79)39(28-68)65-52(80)40-17-13-22-67(40)54(82)35-18-19-41(69)59-35/h8-10,14-15,29-31,33-40,44,68H,7,11-13,16-28,55H2,1-6H3,(H2,56,73)(H,57,81)(H,58,76)(H,59,69)(H,60,70)(H,61,77)(H,62,79)(H,63,74)(H,64,75)(H,65,80)(H,66,78)(H,71,72) Key: AYLPVIWBPZMVSH-UHFFFAOYAZ
- SMILES: O=C(NC(C(=O)NC(C(=O)NC(C(=O)NC(C(=O)NC(C(=O)NC(C(=O)NCC(=O)NC(C(=O)NC(C(=O)N)CCSC)CC(C)C)C(C)CC)Cc1ccccc1)C)CC(=O)O)CCCCN)CO)C3N(C(=O)C2NC(=O)CC2)CCC3

Properties
Chemical formula	C_{54}H_{85}N_{13}O_{15}S
Molar mass	1188.40 g/mol
- Except where otherwise noted, data are given for materials in their standard state (at 25 °C [77 °F], 100 kPa). Infobox references

Eledoisin is an undecapeptide of mollusk origin, belonging to the tachykinin family of neuropeptides.

It was first isolated from the posterior salivary glands of two mollusk species Eledone muschata and Eledone aldovandi, which belong to the octopod order of Cephalopoda.

Other tachykinins from nonmammalian sources include kassinin and physalaemin. The mammalian tachykinins substance P, NKA, and NKB have similar effects as tachykinins of nonmammals and have been more widely studied and characterized. These peptides exhibit a wide and complex spectrum of pharmacological and physiological activities such as vasodilation, hypertension, and stimulation of extravascular smooth muscle.

Eledoisin has the amino acid sequence pGlu-Pro-Ser-Lys-Asp-Ala-Phe-Ile-Gly-Leu-Met-NH2 (qPSKDAFIGLM-NH2) where pGlu and q stand for pyroglutamic acid. Like all tachykinin peptides, Eledoisin shares the same consensus C-terminal sequence, that is, Phe-Xxx-Gly-Leu-Met-NH. The invariant "Phe7" residue is probably required for receptor binding. "Xxx" is either an aromatic (phenylalanine, tyrosine) or a branched aliphatic (valine, isoleucine) side chain and is thought to be important in receptor selectivity. This common region, often referred to as the "message domain," is believed to be responsible for activating the receptor. The divergent N-terminal region or the "address domain" varies in amino-acid sequence and length and is believed to play a role in determining the receptor subtype specificity.
