= Physalaemin =

Names
- Other names H-Pyr-Ala-Asp-Pro-Asn-Lys-Phe-Tyr-Gly-Leu-Met-NH2

Identifiers
CAS Number	2507-24-6
3D model (JSmol)	Interactive image
ChemSpider	32819788
IUPHAR/BPS	2094
MeSH	Physalaemin
PubChem CID	14717795
UNII	H0T4KV6B9J
CompTox Dashboard (EPA)	DTXSID501043248
- InChI: InChI=1S/C58H84N14O16S/c1-31(2)25-39(54(84)66-36(49(61)79)21-24-89-4)65-47(76)30-62-51(81)40(27-34-15-17-35(73)18-16-34)68-55(85)41(26-33-11-6-5-7-12-33)69-53(83)37(13-8-9-22-59)67-56(86)42(28-45(60)74)70-57(87)44-14-10-23-72(44)58(88)43(29-48(77)78)71-50(80)32(3)63-52(82)38-19-20-46(75)64-38/h5-7,11-12,15-18,31-32,36-44,73H,8-10,13-14,19-30,59H2,1-4H3,(H2,60,74)(H2,61,79)(H,62,81)(H,63,82)(H,64,75)(H,65,76)(H,66,84)(H,67,86)(H,68,85)(H,69,83)(H,70,87)(H,71,80)(H,77,78)/t32-,36-,37-,38-,39-,40-,41-,42-,43-,44-/m0/s1 Key: SHSUJLMLURFKID-YFUSJSQUSA-N
- SMILES: C[C@@H](C(=O)N[C@@H](CC(=O)O)C(=O)N1CCC[C@H]1C(=O)N[C@@H](CC(=O)N)C(=O)N[C@@H](CCCCN)C(=O)N[C@@H](CC2=CC=CC=C2)C(=O)N[C@@H](CC3=CC=C(C=C3)O)C(=O)NCC(=O)N[C@@H](CC(C)C)C(=O)N[C@@H](CCSC)C(=O)N)NC(=O)[C@@H]4CCC(=O)N4

Properties
Chemical formula	C_{58}H_{84}N_{14}O_{16}S
Molar mass	1265.45 g·mol^{−1}
- Except where otherwise noted, data are given for materials in their standard state (at 25 °C [77 °F], 100 kPa). verify (what is ?) Infobox references

Physalaemin is a tachykinin peptide obtained from the Physalaemus frog, closely related to substance P. Its structure was first elucidated in 1964.

Like all tachykinins, physalaemin is a sialagogue (increases salivation) and a potent vasodilator with hypotensive effects.

== Structure ==
Physalaemin (PHY) is known to take on both a linear and helical three dimensional structure. Grace et al. (2010) have shown that in aqueous environments, PHY preferentially takes on the linear conformation whereas in an environment that simulates a cellular membrane, PHY takes on a helical confirmation from the Pro^{4} residue to the C-Terminus. This helical conformation is essential to allow the binding of PHY to neurokinin-1 (NK1) receptors. Consensus sequences between Substance P (a mammalian tachykinin and agonist of NK1) and PHY have been used to confirm that the helical confirmation is necessary for PHY to bind to NK1.

== Use In Research ==
Not only is PHY closely related to Substance P (SP), but it also has a higher affinity for the mammalian neurokinin receptors that Substance P can bind to. Researchers can make use of this behavior of PHY to study the behavior of smooth muscle - a tissue where NK1 can be found. Shiina et al. (2010) used PHY to show that tachykinins as a whole can cause the longitudinal contraction of smooth muscle tissue in esophageal tissue.

Singh et Maji made use of PHY's similarity to SP along with its sequence similarity to Amyloid B-peptide 25-35 [AB(25-35)]. Despite its sequence similarity to SP, Singh et Maji showed that PHY had distinct amyloid forming capabilities . Under artificially elevated concentrations of tetrafluoroethylene (TFE) and a short incubation time, PHY was able to form amyloid fibrils. These fibrils originating from tackynins like PHY were also shown to reduce the neurotoxicity of other Amyloid fibers associated with amyloid induced diseases such as Alzheimer's disease.
