= Felypressin =

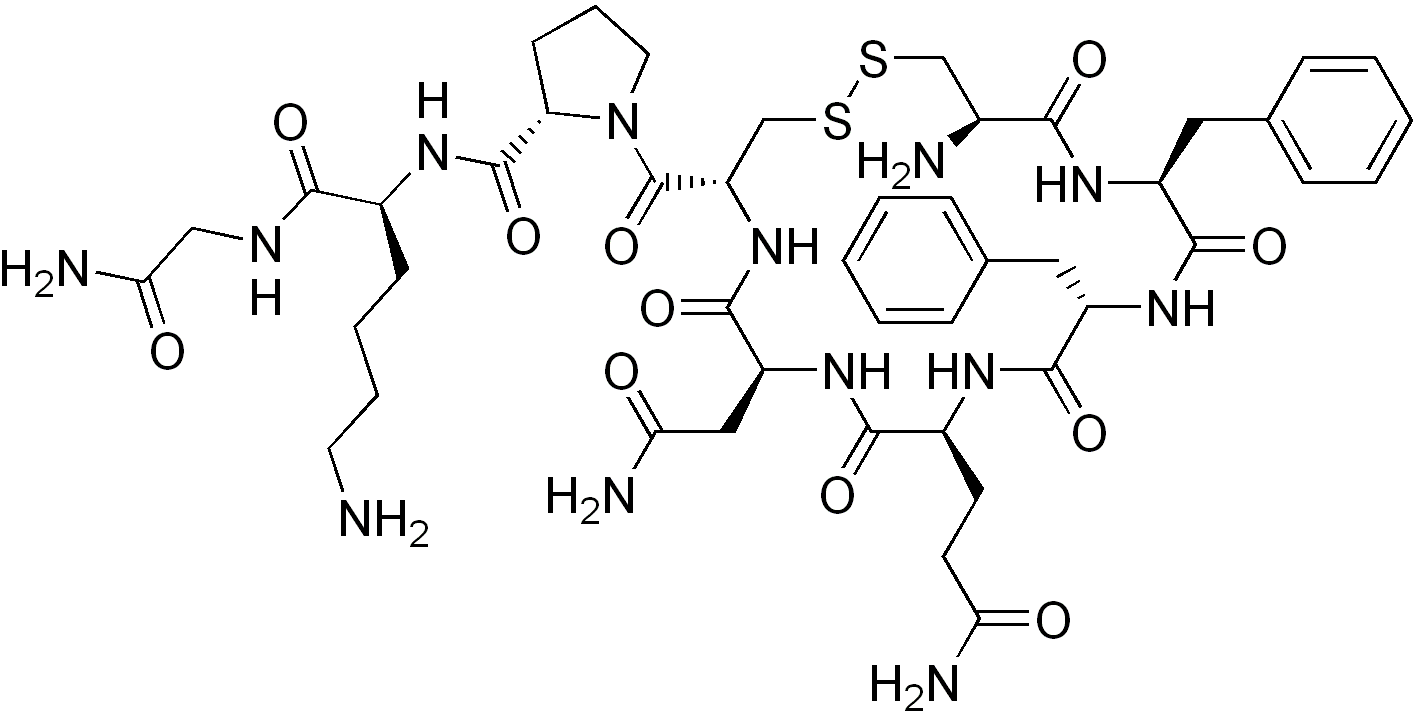

Names
- IUPAC name 1-[19-Amino-13,16-dibenzyl-10-(2-carbamoyl-ethyl)-7-carbamoylmethyl-6,9,12,15,18-pentaoxo-1,2-dithia-5,8,11,14,17-pentaaza-cycloeicosane-4-carbonyl]-pyrrolidine-2-carboxylic acid [5-amino-1-(carbamoylmethyl-carbamoyl)-pentyl]-amide

Identifiers
CAS Number	56-59-7
3D model (JSmol)	Interactive image
ChEBI	CHEBI:60564
ChEMBL	ChEMBL1697764
ChemSpider	16736539
DrugBank	DB00093
ECHA InfoCard	100.000.257
PubChem CID	5956
UNII	17N2918V6G
CompTox Dashboard (EPA)	DTXSID6048599
- InChI: InChI=1S/C46H65N13O11S2/c47-18-8-7-14-29(40(64)52-23-38(51)62)54-45(69)35-15-9-19-59(35)46(70)34-25-72-71-24-28(48)39(63)55-31(20-26-10-3-1-4-11-26)43(67)56-32(21-27-12-5-2-6-13-27)42(66)53-30(16-17-36(49)60)41(65)57-33(22-37(50)61)44(68)58-34/h1-6,10-13,28-35H,7-9,14-25,47-48H2,(H2,49,60)(H2,50,61)(H2,51,62)(H,52,64)(H,53,66)(H,54,69)(H,55,63)(H,56,67)(H,57,65)(H,58,68)/t28-,29-,30-,31-,32-,33-,34-,35-/m0/s1 Key: SFKQVVDKFKYTNA-DZCXQCEKSA-N; InChI=1/C46H65N13O11S2/c47-18-8-7-14-29(40(64)52-23-38(51)62)54-45(69)35-15-9-19-59(35)46(70)34-25-72-71-24-28(48)39(63)55-31(20-26-10-3-1-4-11-26)43(67)56-32(21-27-12-5-2-6-13-27)42(66)53-30(16-17-36(49)60)41(65)57-33(22-37(50)61)44(68)58-34/h1-6,10-13,28-35H,7-9,14-25,47-48H2,(H2,49,60)(H2,50,61)(H2,51,62)(H,52,64)(H,53,66)(H,54,69)(H,55,63)(H,56,67)(H,57,65)(H,58,68)/t28-,29-,30-,31-,32-,33-,34-,35-/m0/s1 Key: SFKQVVDKFKYTNA-DZCXQCEKBI
- SMILES: NC(=O)CNC(=O)[C@H](CCCCN)NC(=O)[C@@H]1CCCN1C(=O)[C@H]4NC(=O)[C@@H](NC(=O)[C@H](CCC(N)=O)NC(=O)[C@H](Cc2ccccc2)NC(=O)[C@H](Cc3ccccc3)NC(=O)[C@@H](N)CSSC4)CC(N)=O

Properties
Chemical formula	C_{46}H_{65}N_{13}O_{11}S_{2}
Molar mass	1040.22 g/mol
- Except where otherwise noted, data are given for materials in their standard state (at 25 °C [77 °F], 100 kPa). verify (what is ?) Infobox references

Felypressin is a non-catecholamine vasoconstrictor that is chemically related to vasopressin, the posterior pituitary hormone. It is added to some local anaesthetics such as prilocaine in a concentration of 0.03 IU/ml. Felypressin is a Vasopressin 1 agonist, and will thus have effects at all Arginine vasopressin receptor 1As. It will, however, have its main physiological effects on vascular SMC's due to the form in which it is administered.

V1 receptors are found in various sites around the body. The major points include the CNS, Liver, Anterior Pituitary, Muscle (both vascular and non-vascular smooth muscle), and Platelets (CLAMP).

Another example of a V1 agonist is terlipressin - which is used in oesophageal varices.
