= Peptide PHI =

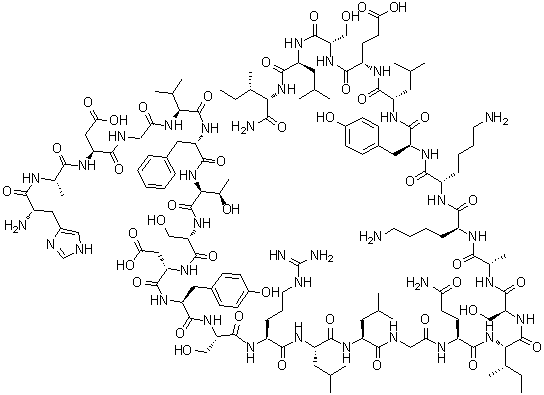
Rat Peptide histidine isoleucine (PHI) structure

Peptide PHI, also known as peptide histidine isoleucine, is a peptide which functions as a hormone. This peptide contains a composition of 27 amino acids with histidine on the N-terminus and isoleucine on the C-terminus. It was originally isolated from the mammalian small intestine amongst mammalian neurons called intramural neurons which function in the motor activity of the intestinal walls. An example of this was revealed in a study that demonstrated that this peptide regulates water and electrolyte transportation in the human jejunum; similar to its inhibitory effects on fluid absorption in the small intestine of pigs and rats.

Peptide histidine isoleucine (PHI) is part of family that plays a vital role in the cell growth rate such as in the intestine as well as in brain. It was derived from glucagon family called the pituitary adenylate cyclase-activating polypeptide (PACAP) and it has an amino acid sequence homology to vasoactive intestinal peptide, secretin, glucagon, and other growth hormone releasing factor. Human studies have shown that the release of PHI into the stomach regulates the neuroendocrine cell processes that affect gastrointestinal physiology. This peptide is present within the central nervous system that help regulate food consumption behavior, while at peripheral nervous system this peptide accumulates in the stomach which controls the digestion of food.

It also plays a role in the regulation of prolactin in humans. It functions specifically function in the G protein signaling pathway through G protein, which is a transmembrane protein that causes the cascade phosphorylation. It is located throughout the entire length of intestine while PHI is mostly concentrated in the colon region.
