= GTP-binding protein regulators =

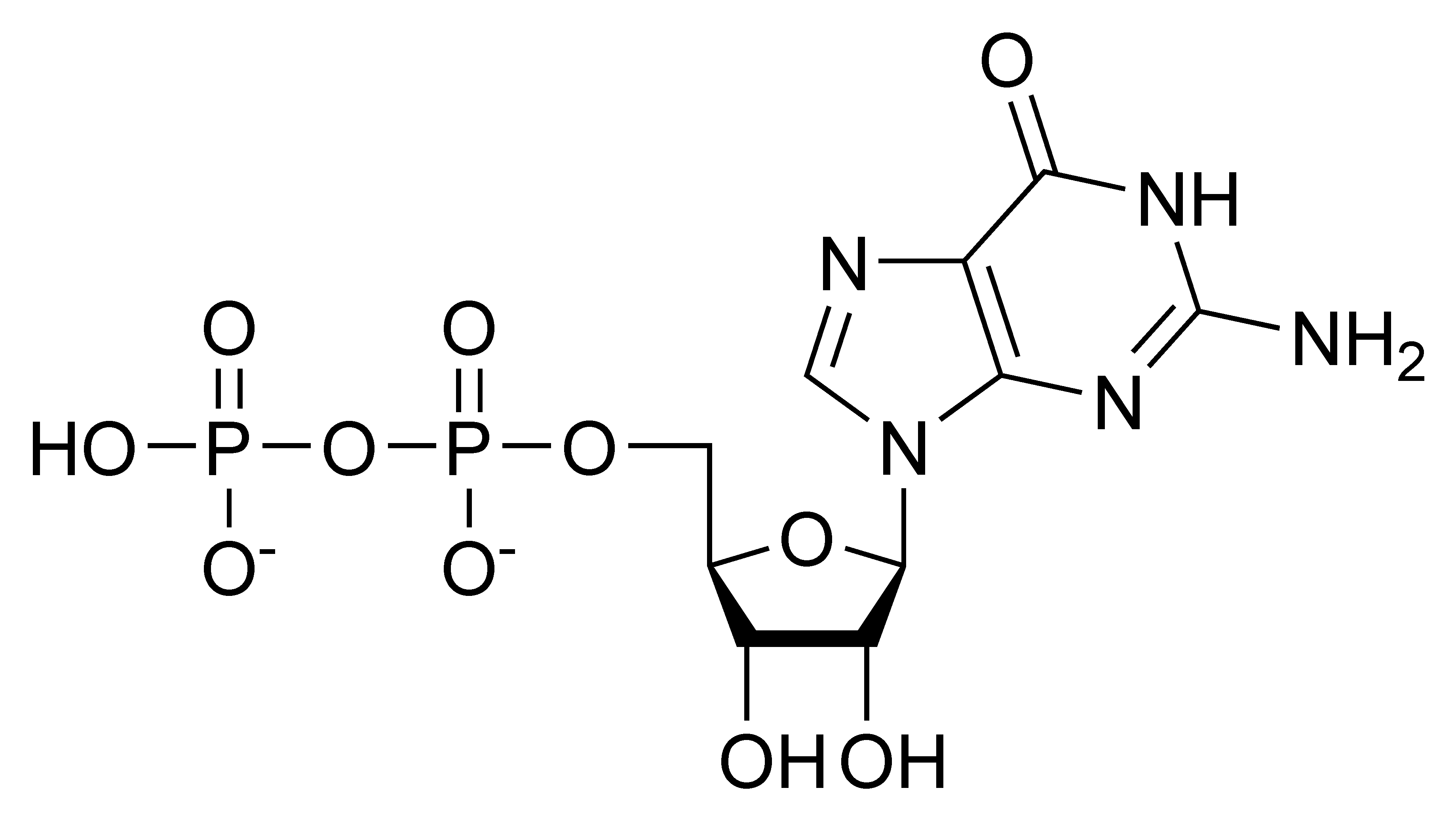
Guanosine diphosphate

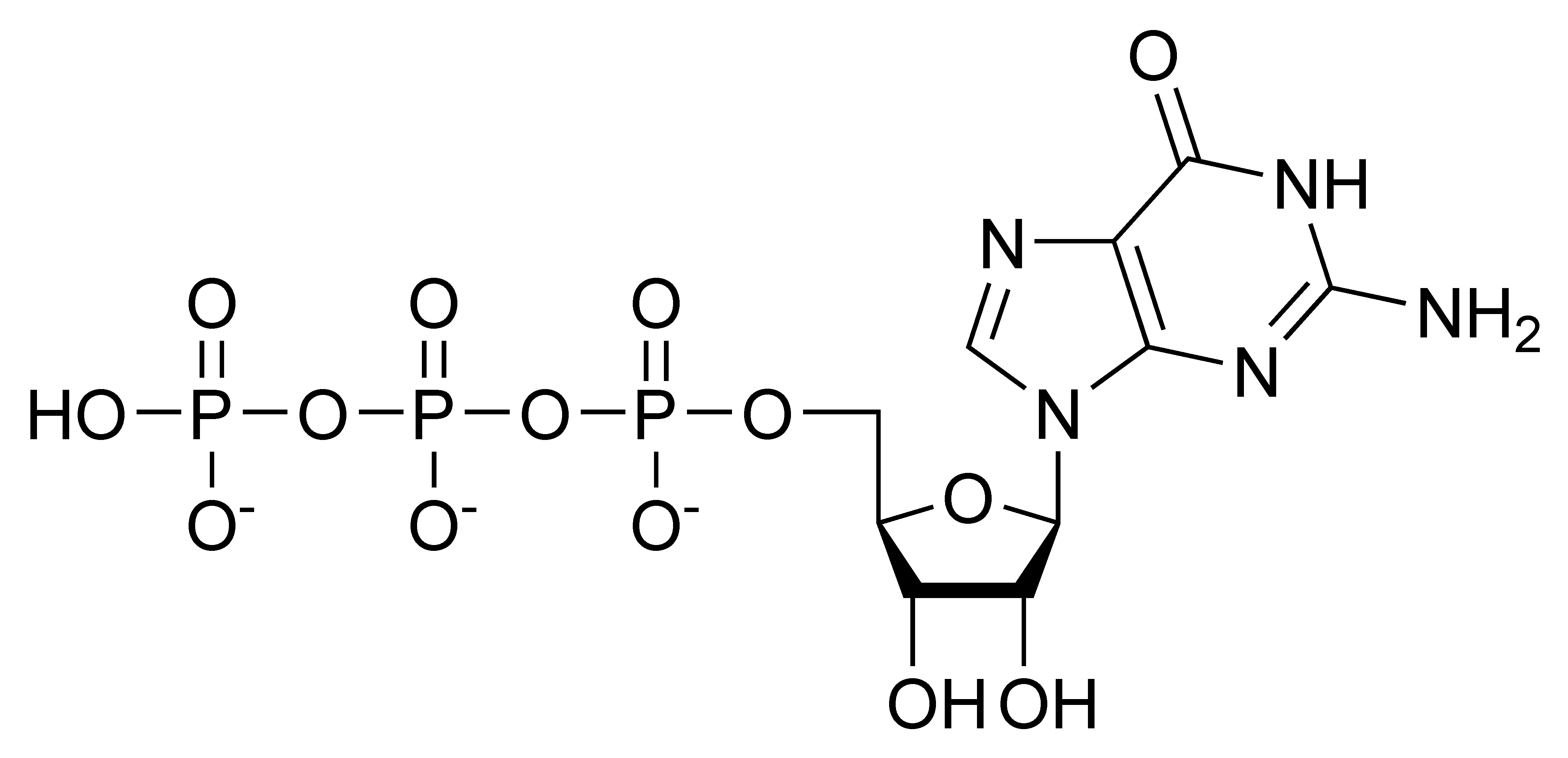
Guanosine triphosphate

GTP-binding protein regulators are a family of proteins that regulate G proteins. They do this in several different ways. Small GTPases act as molecular switches in signaling pathways, which act to regulate functions of other proteins. They are active or 'ON' when it is bound to GTP and inactive or 'OFF' when bound to GDP. Activation and deactivation of small GTPases can be regarded as occurring in a cycle, between the GTP-bound and GDP-bound form, regulated by other regulatory proteins.

== Exchangers ==
The inactive form of GTPases (GDP-form) are activated by a class of proteins called Guanosine nucleotide exchange factors (GEFs). GEFs catalyse nucleotide exchange by encouraging the release of GDP from the small GTPase (by displacement of the small GTPase-associated Mg^{2+} ion) and GDP's replacement by GTP (which is in at least a 10-fold excess within the cell) . Inactivation of the active small GTPase is achieved through hydrolysis of the GTP by the small GTPase's intrinsic GTP hydrolytic activity.

== Stimulators ==
The rate of GTP hydrolysis for small GTPases is generally too slow to create physiologically relevant transient signals, and thus requires another class of regulatory proteins to accelerate this activity, the GTPase activating proteins (GAPs).

== Inhibitors ==
Another class of regulatory proteins, the Guanosine nucleotide dissociation inhibitors (GDIs), bind to the GDP-bound form of Rho and Rab small GTPases and not only prevent exchange (maintaining the small GTPase in an off-state), but also prevent the small GTPase from localizing at the membrane, which is their place of action.
