= Kassinin =

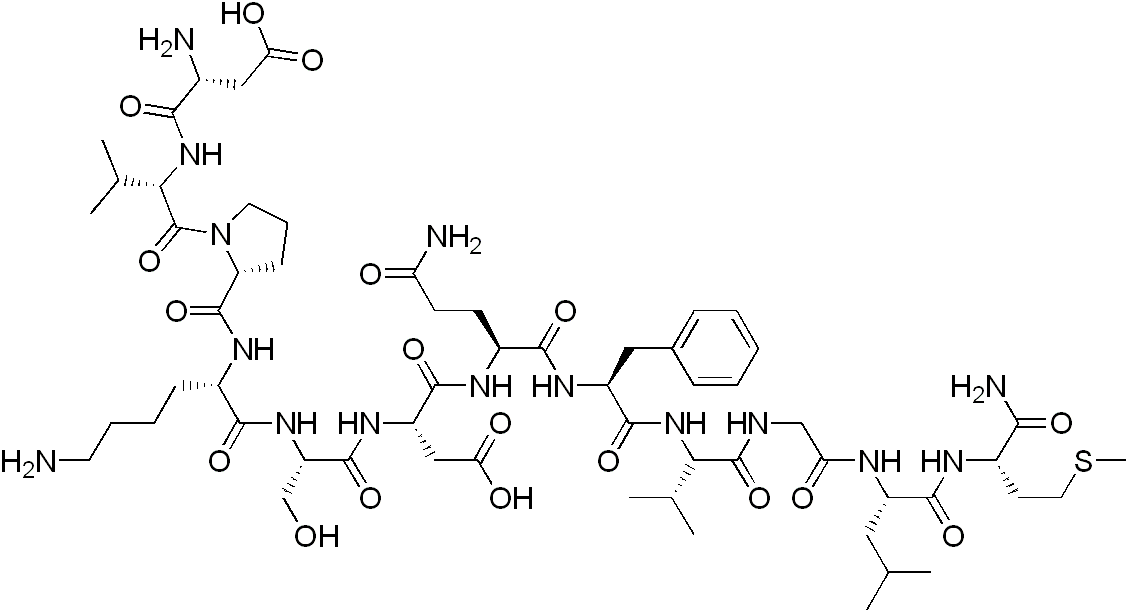

Names
- Other names L-alpha-aspartyl-L-valyl-L-prolyl-L-lysyl-L-seryl-L-alpha-aspartyl-L-glutaminyl-L-phenylalanyl-L-valyl-glycyl-L-leucyl-L-methioninamide

Identifiers
CAS Number	63968-82-1
3D model (JSmol)	Interactive image
ChEMBL	ChEMBL436706
ChemSpider	23215492
IUPHAR/BPS	2088
MeSH	Kassinin
PubChem CID	45749
UNII	9BOP147TRT
CompTox Dashboard (EPA)	DTXSID50895029
- InChI: InChI=1S/C59H95N15O18S/c1-30(2)24-38(53(86)66-35(49(63)82)20-23-93-7)65-44(77)28-64-58(91)47(31(3)4)72-55(88)39(25-33-14-9-8-10-15-33)69-52(85)37(18-19-43(62)76)67-54(87)40(27-46(80)81)70-56(89)41(29-75)71-51(84)36(16-11-12-21-60)68-57(90)42-17-13-22-74(42)59(92)48(32(5)6)73-50(83)34(61)26-45(78)79/h8-10,14-15,30-32,34-42,47-48,75H,11-13,16-29,60-61H2,1-7H3,(H2,62,76)(H2,63,82)(H,64,91)(H,65,77)(H,66,86)(H,67,87)(H,68,90)(H,69,85)(H,70,89)(H,71,84)(H,72,88)(H,73,83)(H,78,79)(H,80,81)/t34-,35-,36-,37-,38-,39-,40-,41-,42-,47-,48-/m0/s1 Key: NXTPETCPVNEEOP-FJCMUPJRSA-N
- SMILES: CC(C)C[C@@H](C(=O)N[C@@H](CCSC)C(=O)N)NC(=O)CNC(=O)[C@H](C(C)C)NC(=O)[C@H](Cc1ccccc1)NC(=O)[C@H](CCC(=O)N)NC(=O)[C@H](CC(=O)O)NC(=O)[C@H](CO)NC(=O)[C@H](CCCCN)NC(=O)[C@@H]2CCCN2C(=O)[C@H](C(C)C)NC(=O)[C@H](CC(=O)O)N

Properties
Chemical formula	C_{59}H_{95}N_{15}O_{18}S
Molar mass	1334.54
- Except where otherwise noted, data are given for materials in their standard state (at 25 °C [77 °F], 100 kPa). verify (what is ?) Infobox references

Kassinin is a peptide derived from the Kassina frog. It belongs to tachykinin family of neuropeptides. It is secreted as a defense response, and is involved in neuropeptide signalling.

The amino acid sequence is H-Asp-Val-Pro-Lys-Ser-Asp-Gln-Phe-Val-Gly-Leu-Met-NH2 (DVPKSDQFVGLM-NH2).

== Ion transportation ==
In frog skin, tachykinins are responsible for ion transportation. Kassinin is one of the tachykinin peptides, which interacts with NK2 receptor to increase short circuit current (SCC), resulting in an ion transportation in frog skin. Another peptide that belongs to tachykinin family is Eledoisin that interacts with NK3 receptor for stimulation of SCC, but can be reduced by either NK1 or NK2 antagonist, whereas kassinin can't be reduced by either of these NK1, NK2 or NK3 antagonists. Kassinin is very effective in increasing short circuit current to its maximum within 10 minutes with increase of 26.13 ± 1.53 μΑ/cm^{2}.

There are some requirements that must be accomplished to gain short circuit stimulation. One of them is to have Phe-X-Gly-Leu-Met-NH_{2} sequence at C-terminal where X could be Val or Ile. The other requirement is to have 2 or 1 proline residue at N-terminal. If only one proline residue is present, then there must be one basic amino acid present in the sequence. For instance kassinin has one proline residue and one basic amino acid (Lys). Another example would be of enterokassinin that does have one proline reside but doesn't have any basic amino acid in the sequence. Thus it doesn't increase SCC and therefore is ineffective in ion transportation. While kassinin plays an efficient role in ion transportation in frog skin.

== Tachykinins ==
Study of amphibious kassinin has allowed breakthrough discoveries of mammalian tachykinins. Substance P (SP) was originally considered the only neuropeptide in mammals capable of neuromodulation, with the X position of the carboxyl sequence typical for these polypeptides having a Phe residue. In 1983, two neuropeptides with X = Val were discovered from bovine spinal serum, and bioassays to test for the measured synaptic response and their inhibition by known antagonists revealed that this was a novel discovery that differed from SP. Previously, mammalian receptors were only thought to be specific to SP and divided into SP-P and SP-E receptors, the latter of which was much more potent (approximately 10-100 fold) in response and named after Eledoisin which was non-mammalian. Testing the hypothesis that SP-E receptors were potent because they must have another ligand of greater specificity led to the discovery of the aforementioned novel neuropeptides. Aptly named Substake K (SK) and neuromedin K (NMK) due to structural homology with kassinin, the pharmacological effects also establish these as major player in mammalian systems, with SK having only 1/3rd the effect on SP-P specific receptors while SP-E receptors in rat vas deferense experienced a 300x greater effect upon binding SK. With only 3 tachykinins having been studied, it was the study of kassinin that allowed these emprical comparisons to be made.

=== As a research tool ===
Novel discovery of new mammalian tachykinins similar to amphibian Kasshinin led to an interest in postulating kassinin's direct action on mammalian CNS. Kassinin injections administered to rats upon subjecting their cells to dehydration due to high salt content, led to the discovery that the neuropeptide inhibits thirst despite the cellular dehydration for up to several hours. Throughout the duration of study, sodium excreted through urine is also low in concentration, and given that the amount of water intake after 6 hours is not sufficient to restore osmotic balance, scientists hypothesize that kassinin triggers an osmotic exchange between intra and intercellular components to maintain water potential. Whether this is due to a CNS modification in the homeostatic regulation of cecllular osmosis is undetermined.

While kassinin is not synthesized in the human CNS and PNS, it has been reported via exposure to external elements and can hence be considered a component of the human exposome, which, given the greater extent of homology in human and rate genome justified to growing interest in the neuropeptide.
