= Guanylate cyclase activator =

Member of a group of proteins that upregulate guanylate cyclase

A guanylate cyclase activator (or "GUCA") is a member of a group of proteins that upregulate guanylate cyclase. GUCA is also known as guanylate cyclase-activating protein (or "GCAP"). Its mutations can be associated with vision defects.

There are five genes involved:

- GUCA1A, GUCA1B, GUCA1C
- GUCA2A, GUCA2B

There are several therapeutic drugs that act as GUCAs, including linaclotide and plecanatide, which are guanylate cyclase-C receptor agonists. These drugs increase the secretion of bicarbonate and chloride in the colon and potentially relieve visceral hypersensitivity in IBS-C patients.

Guanyl cyclase targeting drug, Cinaciguat has emerged in recent years as one of the first in the class of soluble guanyl cyclase activator. Soluble guanyl class is a version of guanyl cyclase that has a primary preference for nitric oxide(NO) sensitivity, with some variants beings more insensitive to NO than others but still remaining soluble within the cell cytosol. Cinaciguat targets the specifically the soluble form of guanyl cyclase. This guanyl that triggers reduced blood flow through GTP to cGMP conversion. The cGMP acts as a secondary messenger to target reduced blood flow pathways. This pathway has been linked to several cardiovascular diseases, such as ADHF(acute decompensated heart failure) which Cinaciguat has been developed to target.
