= Neurocalcin =

Mammalian protein found in Homo sapiens

NCALD

Identifiers
- Aliases: NCALD, neurocalcin delta
- External IDs: OMIM: 606722; MGI: 1196326; GeneCards: NCALD
Available structures
PDB	Ortholog search: PDBe RCSB
PDB	List of PDB id codes 1BJF

Gene location (Human)
Chr.	Chromosome 8 (human)
Band	8q22.3	Start	101,686,542 bp
Band	8q22.3	End	102,124,907 bp

Gene location (Mouse)
Chr.	Chromosome 15 (mouse)
Band	15 B3.1|15 14.94 cM	Start	37,366,175 bp
Band	15 B3.1|15 14.94 cM	End	37,792,570 bp
RNA expression pattern
Bgee	Human / Mouse (ortholog); Top expressed in: Brodmann area 10; frontal pole; primary visual cortex; orbitofrontal cortex; Brodmann area 46; middle temporal gyrus; dorsolateral prefrontal cortex; right frontal lobe; Brodmann area 23; superior frontal gyrus / Top expressed in: lateral septal nucleus; dentate gyrus; dentate gyrus of hippocampal formation granule cell; primary motor cortex; ventromedial nucleus; visual cortex; primary visual cortex; amygdala; prefrontal cortex; piriform cortex; More reference expression data
BioGPS	n/a
Gene ontology
Molecular function	tubulin binding; clathrin binding; calcium ion binding; actin binding; alpha-tubulin binding; protein binding; metal ion binding; ligand-gated ion channel activity
Cellular component	cytosol; intracellular anatomical structure; clathrin coat of trans-Golgi network vesicle
Biological process	vesicle-mediated transport; calcium-mediated signaling; regulation of systemic arterial blood pressure; ion transmembrane transport
Sources:Amigo / QuickGO
Orthologs
Databases	NCBI: entry; OMA: entry
Species	Human	Mouse
Entrez	83988	52589
Ensembl	ENSG00000104490	ENSMUSG00000051359
UniProt	P61601	Q91X97
RefSeq (mRNA)	NM_001040624; NM_001040625; NM_001040626; NM_001040627; NM_001040628 NM_001040629; NM_001040630; NM_032041	NM_001170866; NM_001170867; NM_001170868; NM_134094; NM_001359839 NM_001359840; NM_001359841; NM_001359842; NM_001359843; NM_001359844; NM_001359845
RefSeq (protein)	NP_001035714; NP_001035715; NP_001035716; NP_001035717; NP_001035718 NP_001035719; NP_001035720; NP_114430	NP_001164337; NP_001164338; NP_001164339; NP_598855; NP_001346768 NP_001346769; NP_001346770; NP_001346771; NP_001346772; NP_001346773; NP_001346774
Location (UCSC)	Chr 8: 101.69 – 102.12 Mb	Chr 15: 37.37 – 37.79 Mb
PubMed search
- Wikidata
View/Edit Human	View/Edit Mouse

neurocalcin delta
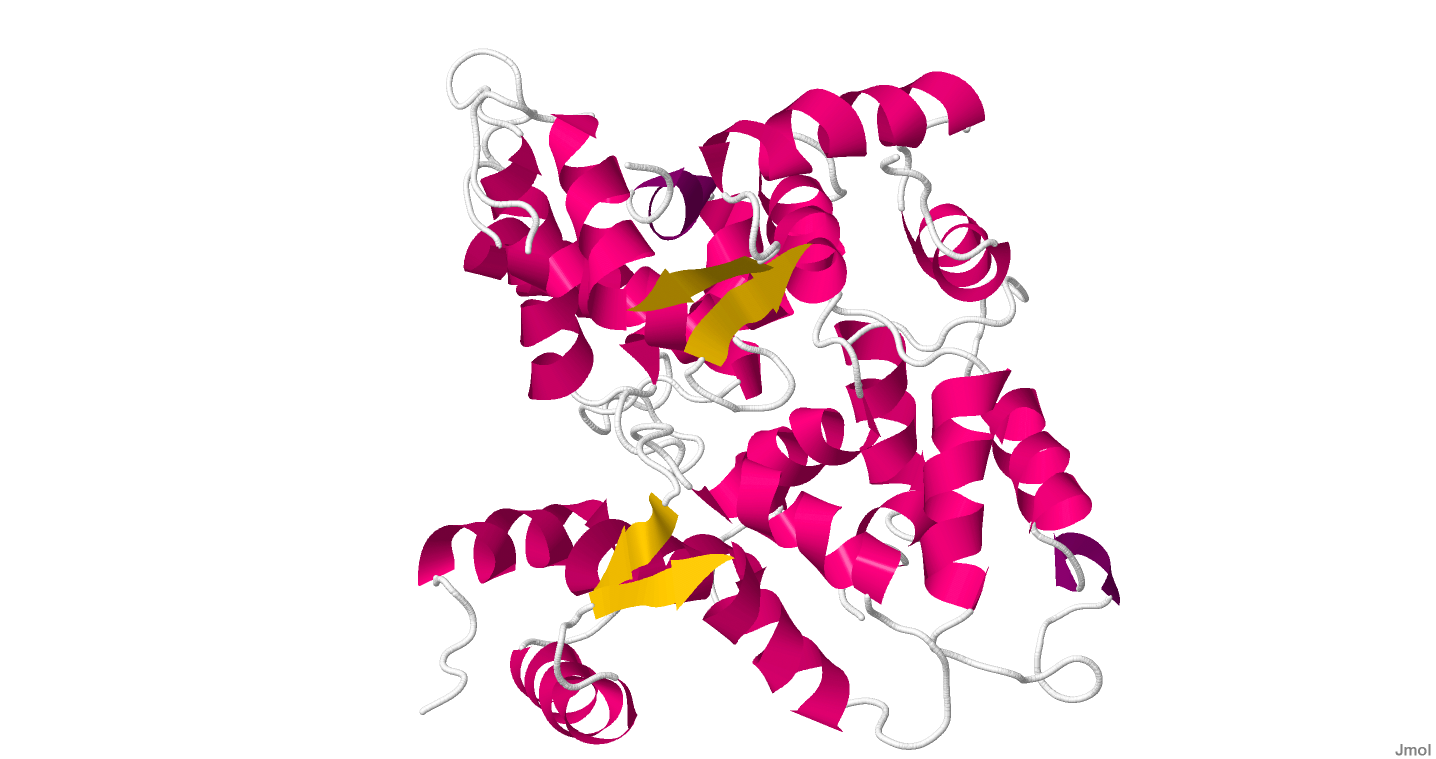

Identifiers
- Symbol: NCALD
- NCBI gene: 83988
- HGNC: 7655
- OMIM: 606722
- RefSeq: NM_001040628
- UniProt: P61601

Other data
- Locus: Chr. 8 q22-q23
Search for
- Structures: Swiss-model
- Domains: InterPro

Neurocalcin delta is a neuronal calcium-binding protein which in humans is encoded by the NCALD gene. Neurocalcin belongs to the neuronal calcium sensor (NCS) family of proteins. It expressed in mammalian brains. It possesses a Ca^{2+}/myristoyl switch

The subclass of neurocalcins are brain-specific proteins that fit into the EF-hand superfamily of calcium binding proteins. The NCS family were defined by the photoreceptor cell-specific protein, recoverin. Neurocalcin was purified from the bovine brain by using calcium-dependent drug affinity chromatography. The amino acid sequence showed that neurocalcin has three functional calcium binding sites. It is expressed in the central nervous system, retina, and adrenal gland. With this unique pattern of expression it is thought that neurcalcin offers a different physiological role than similar proteins visinin and recoverin.

Neurocalcin delta an isoform of Neurocalcin is known to regulate adult neurogenesis.
