= Olfactory marker protein =

olfactory marker protein

Identifiers
- Symbol: OMP
- NCBI gene: 4975
- HGNC: 8136
- OMIM: 164340
- RefSeq: NM_006189
- UniProt: P47874

Other data
- Locus: Chr. 11 q14-q21
Search for
- Structures: Swiss-model
- Domains: InterPro

Olfactory marker protein
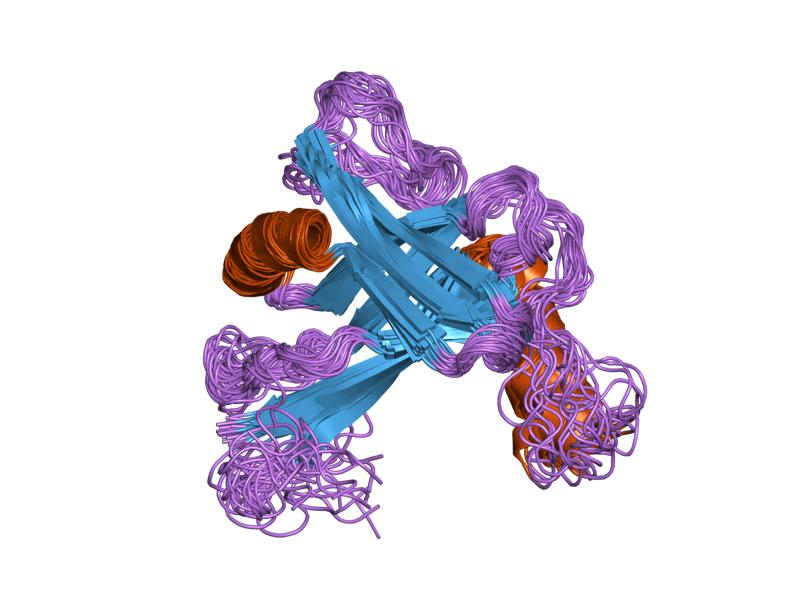
- solution structure of olfactory marker protein from rat

Identifiers
- Symbol: Olfactory_mark
- Pfam: PF06554
- InterPro: IPR009103
- SCOP2: 1jyt / SCOPe / SUPFAM
Available protein structures:
- PDB: IPR009103 PF06554 (ECOD; PDBsum)
- AlphaFold: IPR009103; PF06554

In molecular biology, olfactory marker protein is a protein involved in signal transduction. It is a highly expressed, cytoplasmic protein found in mature olfactory sensory receptor neurons of all vertebrates. OMP is a modulator of the olfactory signal transduction cascade. The crystal structure of OMP reveals a beta sandwich consisting of eight strands in two sheets with a jelly-roll topology. Three highly conserved regions have been identified as possible protein–protein interaction sites in OMP, indicating a possible role for OMP in modulating such interactions, thereby acting as a molecular switch.
