= Son of Sevenless =

Set of genes in cell signalling

son of sevenless homolog 1

Identifiers
- Symbol: SOS1
- Alt. symbols: GINGF
- NCBI gene: 6654
- HGNC: 11187
- OMIM: 182530
- RefSeq: NM_005633
- UniProt: Q07889

Other data
- Locus: Chr. 2 p21
Search for
- Structures: Swiss-model
- Domains: InterPro

son of sevenless homolog 2

Identifiers
- Symbol: SOS2
- NCBI gene: 6655
- HGNC: 11188
- OMIM: 601247
- RefSeq: NM_006939
- UniProt: Q07890

Other data
- Locus: Chr. 14 q21
Search for
- Structures: Swiss-model
- Domains: InterPro

In cell signalling, Son of Sevenless (SOS) refers to a set of genes encoding guanine nucleotide exchange factors that act on the Ras subfamily of small GTPases.

== History and name ==
The gene was so named because the Sos protein that it encoded was found to operate downstream of the sevenless gene in Drosophila melanogaster in a Ras/MAP kinase pathway. When sevenless is mutated or otherwise dysfunctional during development of the fly's ultraviolet light-sensitive compound eye, the seventh, central photoreceptor (R7) of each ommatidium fails to form. Similarly, the mammalian orthologues of Sos, SOS1 and SOS2, function downstream of many growth factor and adhesion receptors.

== Function ==
Ras-GTPases act as molecular switches that bind to downstream effectors, such as the protein kinase c-Raf, and localise them to the membrane, resulting in their activation. Ras-GTPases are considered inactive when bound to guanosine diphosphate (GDP), and active when bound to guanosine triphosphate (GTP). As the name implies, Ras-GTPases possess intrinsic enzymatic activity that hydrolyses GTP to GDP and phosphate. Thus, upon binding to GTP, the duration of Ras-GTPase activity depends on the rate of hydrolysis. SOS (and other guanine nucleotide exchange factors) act by binding Ras-GTPases and forcing them to release their bound nucleotide (usually GDP). Once released from SOS, the Ras-GTPase quickly binds fresh guanine nucleotide from the cytosol. Since GTP is roughly ten times more abundant than GDP in the cytosol, this usually results in Ras activation. The normal rate of Ras catalytic GTPase (GTP hydrolysis) activity can be increased by proteins of the RasGAP family, which bind to Ras and increase its catalytic rate by a factor of one thousand - in effect, increasing the rate at which Ras is inactivated.

== Genetic diseases associated with SOS1 ==
Dominant mutant alleles of SOS1 have recently been found to cause Noonan syndrome and hereditary gingival fibromatosis type 1. Noonan syndrome has also been shown to be caused by mutations in KRAS and PTPN11 genes. A common feature of these genes is that their products have all been strongly implicated as positive regulators of the Ras/MAP kinase signal transduction pathway. Therefore, it is thought that dysregulation of this pathway during development is responsible for many of the clinical features of this syndrome.

Noonan syndrome mutations in SOS1 are distributed in clusters positioned throughout the SOS1 coding region. Biochemically, these mutations have been shown to similarly effect aberrant activation of the catalytic domain towards Ras-GTPases. This may be explained because the SOS1 protein adopts an auto-inhibited conformation dependent on multiple domain-to-domain interactions that cooperate to block access of the SOS1 catalytic core to its Ras-GTPase targets. The mutations that cause Noonan syndrome thus appear to perturb intramolecular interactions necessary for SOS1 auto-inhibition. In this way these mutations are thought to create SOS1 alleles encoding hyper-activated and dysregulated variants of the protein.

Overview of signal transduction pathways involved in apoptosis.
