= Peptide =

Short chains of 2–50 amino acids

Drosomycin, an example of a peptide

Peptides are short chains of amino acids linked by peptide bonds. A polypeptide is a longer, continuous, unbranched peptide chain. Polypeptides that have a molecular mass of 10,000 Da or more are called proteins. Chains of fewer than twenty amino acids are called oligopeptides, and include dipeptides, tripeptides, and tetrapeptides.

Amino acids comprise peptides as residues. Peptides are usually linear polymers with a free amine at one end (the so-called N-terminus) and a carboxyl group at the other (the C-terminus). Macrocyclic peptides are a distinct class.

== Classification ==
Peptides have been classified according to their sources and functions. Some groups of peptides include plant peptides, bacterial/antibiotic peptides, fungal peptides, invertebrate peptides, amphibian/skin peptides, venom peptides, cancer/anticancer peptides, vaccine peptides, immune/inflammatory peptides, brain peptides, endocrine peptides, ingestive peptides, gastrointestinal peptides, cardiovascular peptides, renal peptides, respiratory peptides, opioid peptides, neurotrophic peptides, and blood–brain peptides.

Some ribosomal peptides are subject to proteolysis. These function, typically in higher organisms, as hormones and signaling molecules. Some microbes produce peptides as antibiotics, such as microcins and bacteriocins.

Peptides frequently have post-translational modifications such as phosphorylation, hydroxylation, sulfonation, palmitoylation, glycosylation, and disulfide formation. In general, peptides are linear, although lariat structures have been observed. More exotic manipulations do occur, such as racemization of L-amino acids to D-amino acids in platypus venom.

Nonribosomal peptides are assembled by enzymes, not the ribosome. A common non-ribosomal peptide is glutathione, a component of the antioxidant defenses of most aerobic organisms. Other nonribosomal peptides are most common in unicellular organisms, plants, and fungi and are synthesized by modular enzyme complexes called nonribosomal peptide synthetases.

These complexes are often laid out in a similar fashion, and they can contain many different modules to perform a diverse set of chemical manipulations on the developing product. These peptides are often cyclic and can have highly complex cyclic structures, although linear nonribosomal peptides are also common. Since the system is closely related to the machinery for building fatty acids and polyketides, hybrid compounds are often found. The presence of oxazoles or thiazoles often indicates that the compound was synthesized in this fashion.

Peptones are derived from animal milk or meat digested by proteolysis. In addition to containing small peptides, the resulting material includes fats, metals, salts, vitamins, and many other biological compounds. Peptones are used in nutrient media for growing bacteria and fungi.

Peptide fragments refer to fragments of proteins that are used to identify or quantify the source protein. Often these are the products of enzymatic degradation performed in the laboratory on a controlled sample, but can also be forensic or paleontological samples that have been degraded by natural effects.

== Chemical synthesis ==
Solid-phase peptide synthesis on a rink amide resin using Fmoc-α-amine-protected amino acid

== Protein–peptide interactions ==
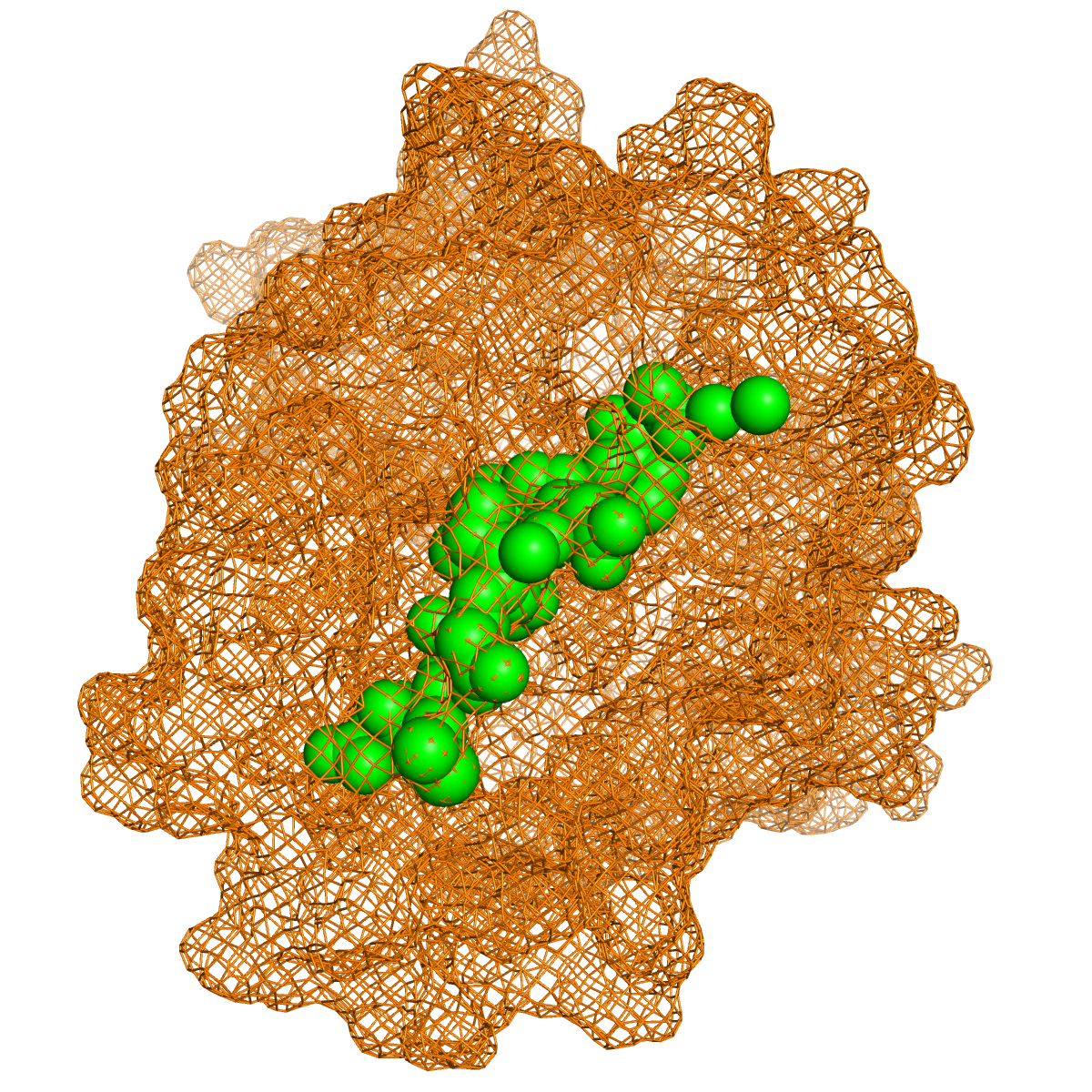
Example of a protein (orange) and peptide (green) interaction. Obtained from Propedia: a peptide-protein interactions database.

Peptides can perform interactions with proteins and other macromolecules. They are responsible for numerous important functions in human cells, such as cell signaling, and act as immune modulators. Indeed, studies have reported that 15-40% of all protein–protein interactions in human cells are mediated by peptides. Additionally, it is estimated that at least 10% of the pharmaceutical market is based on peptide products.

== Applications of machine learning in peptide prediction ==
Machine learning and deep learning architectures are extensively utilized to classify, screen, and design peptides based on sequence- and structure-derived data. These computational approaches are particularly valuable when experimental screening is cost-prohibitive, time-consuming, or difficult to scale. A standard workflow typically involves dataset curation, the transformation of peptide sequences or structures into numerical features, model optimization, and rigorous performance validation. Commonly used representations include amino acid composition, physicochemical descriptors, substitution matrices, and learned embeddings derived from protein or peptide language models. These methodologies have been successfully applied across various functional classes, such as antimicrobial peptides, cell-penetrating peptides, and anticancer agents. Current challenges in the field include addressing dataset biases, establishing consistent benchmarking protocols, and improving the interpretability of complex "black-box" models.

== Molecular properties and chemical space of peptides ==
The chemical space of peptides is defined as a multidimensional landscape shaped by molecular descriptors or fingerprints. Within these frameworks, the distance between specific molecules serves as a proxy for chemical or functional similarity. This space can be mapped using primary amino acid sequences, three-dimensional structural data, or a combination of both. Key molecular properties used for mapping include molecular weight, lipophilicity (logP and logD), topological polar surface area (TPSA), and hydrogen-bond dynamics. Dimensionality-reduction techniques—such as Principal Component Analysis (PCA), t-SNE, and UMAP—are frequently employed alongside clustering algorithms to visualize peptide libraries and identify clusters with related biological activities. Peptides are distinguished from traditional small molecules by their unique combination of residue sequence, amide backbone flexibility, and susceptibility to chemical modifications, all of which dictate bioavailability and membrane permeability. Computational analysis is supported by notation systems like FASTA, HELM, and BILN for encoding both canonical and modified sequences. Modifications such as cyclization or the integration of non-natural amino acids significantly shift a peptide's position within the chemical space, altering its stability and target affinity. Consequently, chemical-space analysis is a vital tool for virtual screening and the discovery of shared bioactivity regions across different peptide families.

== Example families ==
The peptide families in this section are ribosomal peptides, usually with hormonal activity. All of these peptides are synthesized by cells as longer "propeptides" or "proproteins" and truncated prior to exiting the cell. They are released into the bloodstream where they perform their signaling functions.

=== Antimicrobial peptides ===
- Magainin family
- Cecropin family
- Cathelicidin family
- Defensin family

=== Tachykinin peptides ===
- Substance P
- Kassinin
- Neurokinin A
- Eledoisin
- Neurokinin B

=== Vasoactive intestinal peptides ===
- Vasoactive intestinal peptide (VIP; PHM27)
- Pituitary adenylate cyclase activating peptide (PACAP)
- Peptide PHI 27 (peptide histidine isoleucine 27)
- Growth hormone releasing hormone (GHRH) 1-24
- Glucagon
- Secretin

=== Pancreatic polypeptide-related peptides ===
- Neuropeptide Y (NPY)
- Peptide YY (PYY)
- Avian pancreatic polypeptide (APP)
- Pancreatic polypeptide (PPY)

=== Opioid peptides ===
- Proopiomelanocortin (POMC) peptides
- Enkephalin pentapeptides
- Prodynorphin peptides

=== Calcitonin peptides ===
- Calcitonin
- Amylin
- AGG01

=== Self-assembling peptides ===
- Aromatic short peptides
- Biomimetic peptides
- Peptide amphiphiles
- Peptide dendrimers

=== Other peptides ===
- B-type Natriuretic Peptide (BNP) – produced in the myocardium and useful in medical diagnosis
- Lactotripeptides – Lactotripeptides might reduce blood pressure, although the evidence is mixed.
- Peptidic components from traditional Chinese medicine Colla Corii Asini in hematopoiesis.
- Jelleine – produced from royal jelly of honey bees.

== Terminology ==
=== Length ===
Several terms related to peptides have no strict length definitions, and there is often overlap in their usage:

- A polypeptide is a single linear chain of many amino acids (any length), held together by amide bonds.
- A protein consists of one or more polypeptides (more than about 50 amino acids long).
- An oligopeptide consists of only a few amino acids (between two and twenty).

=== Number of amino acids ===
A tripeptide (example Val-Gly-Ala) with green marked amino end (L-valine) and blue marked carboxyl end (L-alanine)

Peptides and proteins are often described by the number of amino acids in their chain, e.g. a protein with 158 amino acids may be described as a "158 amino-acid-long protein". Peptides of specific shorter lengths are named using IUPAC numerical multiplier prefixes:

- A monopeptide has one amino acid (not alone but combined with (an)other type(s) of molecule(s)).
- A dipeptide has two amino acids.
- A tripeptide has three amino acids.
- A tetrapeptide has four amino acids.
- A pentapeptide has five amino acids. (e.g., enkephalin).
- A hexapeptide has six amino acids. (e.g., angiotensin IV).
- A heptapeptide has seven amino acids. (e.g., spinorphin).
- An octapeptide has eight amino acids (e.g., angiotensin II).
- A nonapeptide has nine amino acids (e.g., oxytocin).
- A decapeptide has ten amino acids (e.g., gonadotropin-releasing hormone and angiotensin I).
- A undecapeptide has eleven amino acids (e.g., substance P).

The same words are also used to describe a group of residues in a larger polypeptide (e.g., RGD motif).

=== Function ===
- A neuropeptide is a peptide that is active in association with neural tissue.
- A lipopeptide is a peptide that has a lipid connected to it, and pepducins are lipopeptides that interact with GPCRs.
- A peptide hormone is a peptide that acts as a hormone.
- A proteose is a mixture of peptides produced by the hydrolysis of proteins. The term is somewhat archaic.
- A peptidergic agent (or drug) is a chemical which functions to directly modulate the peptide systems in the body or brain. An example is opioidergics, which are neuropeptidergics.
- A cell-penetrating peptide is a peptide able to penetrate the cell membrane.

== See also ==
- Acetyl hexapeptide-3
- Beefy meaty peptide
- Collagen hybridizing peptide, a short peptide that can bind to denatured collagen in tissues
- Bis-peptide
- CLE peptide
- D-peptide
- Epidermal growth factor
- Journal of Peptide Science
- Lactotripeptides
- Micropeptide
- Neuropeptide
- Palmitoyl pentapeptide-4
- Pancreatic hormone
- Peptide spectral library
- Peptide synthesis
- Peptidomimetics (such as peptoids and β-peptides) to peptides, but with different properties.
- Protein tag, describing addition of peptide sequences to enable protein isolation or detection
- Replikins
- Ribosome
- Translation (biology)
