= Intracellular calcium-sensing proteins =

Intracellular calcium-sensing proteins are proteins that act in the second messenger system.

Examples include:

- calmodulin
- calnexin
- calreticulin
- gelsolin
