= Chimerin 1 =

Protein found in humans

CHN1
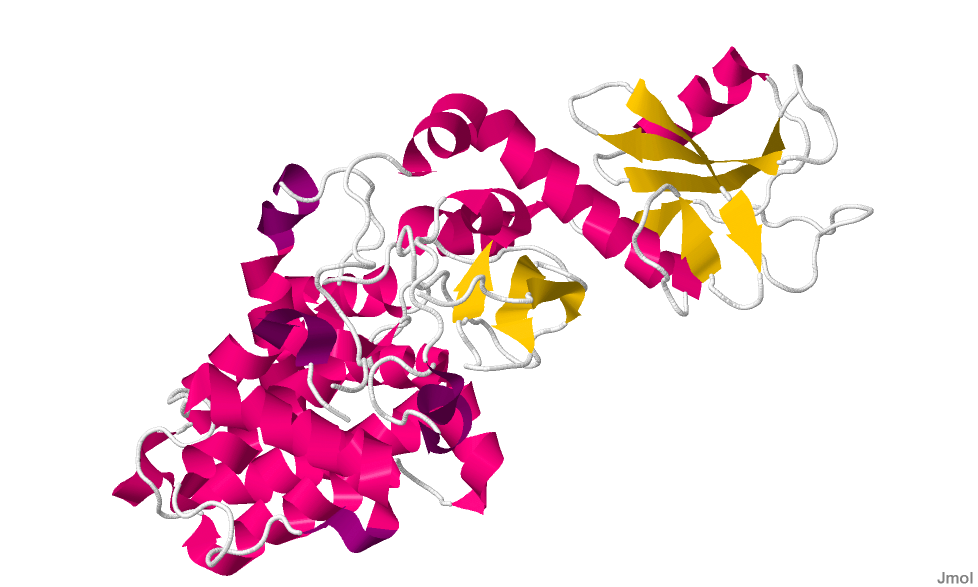

Identifiers
- Aliases: CHN1, chimerin 1, ARHGAP2, CHN, DURS2, NC, RHOGAP2
- External IDs: OMIM: 118423; MGI: 1915674; GeneCards: CHN1
Available structures
PDB	Ortholog search: PDBe RCSB
PDB	List of PDB id codes 2OSA, 3CXL

Gene location (Human)
Chr.	Chromosome 2 (human)
Band	2q31.1	Start	174,798,809 bp
Band	2q31.1	End	175,005,381 bp

Gene location (Mouse)
Chr.	Chromosome 2 (mouse)
Band	2|2 C3	Start	73,610,660 bp
Band	2|2 C3	End	73,775,346 bp
RNA expression pattern
Bgee	Human / Mouse (ortholog); Top expressed in: middle temporal gyrus; Brodmann area 23; endothelial cell; primary visual cortex; superior frontal gyrus; orbitofrontal cortex; frontal pole; Brodmann area 46; dorsolateral prefrontal cortex; parietal lobe / Top expressed in: dentate gyrus of hippocampal formation granule cell; superior frontal gyrus; olfactory tubercle; primary motor cortex; primary visual cortex; amygdala; piriform cortex; prefrontal cortex; subdivision of hippocampus; hippocampus proper; More reference expression data
BioGPS	n/a
Gene ontology
Molecular function	ephrin receptor binding; protein binding; metal ion binding; GTPase activator activity
Cellular component	cytoplasm; cytosol
Biological process	regulation of axonogenesis; positive regulation of GTPase activity; intracellular signal transduction; motor neuron axon guidance; regulation of small GTPase mediated signal transduction; nervous system development; signal transduction; positive regulation of signal transduction; ephrin receptor signaling pathway; regulation of GTPase activity
Sources:Amigo / QuickGO
Orthologs
Databases	NCBI: entry; OMA: entry
Species	Human	Mouse
Entrez	1123	108699
Ensembl	ENSG00000128656	ENSMUSG00000056486
UniProt	P15882	Q91V57
RefSeq (mRNA)	NM_001025201; NM_001206602; NM_001822; NM_001371513; NM_001371514	NM_001113246; NM_001166603; NM_001166604; NM_029716; NM_175752
RefSeq (protein)	NP_001020372; NP_001193531; NP_001813	NP_001106717; NP_001160075; NP_001160076; NP_083992; NP_786928
Location (UCSC)	Chr 2: 174.8 – 175.01 Mb	Chr 2: 73.61 – 73.78 Mb
PubMed search
- Wikidata
View/Edit Human	View/Edit Mouse

chimerin (chimaerin) 1
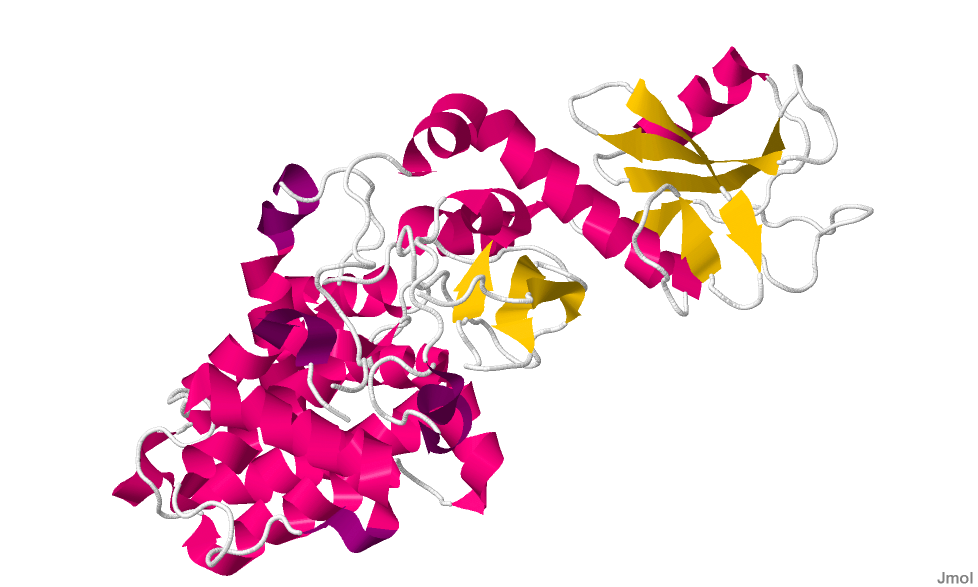
- Crystal structure of human chimerin 1 (CHN1)

Identifiers
- Symbol: CHN1
- Alt. symbols: CHN
- NCBI gene: 1123
- HGNC: 1943
- OMIM: 118423
- RefSeq: NM_001822
- UniProt: P15882

Other data
- Locus: Chr. 2 q31-q32.1
Search for
- Structures: Swiss-model
- Domains: InterPro

Chimerin 1 (CHN1), also known as alpha-1-chimerin, n-chimerin, is a protein which in humans is encoded by the CHN1 gene.

Chimerin 1 is a GTPase activating protein specific for RAC GTP-binding proteins. It is expressed primarily in the brain and may be involved in signal transduction.

This gene encodes GTPase-activating protein for p21-rac and a phorbol ester receptor. It plays an important role in ocular motor axon pathfinding.

== Function ==
CHN1 is a three-domain protein with the N-terminal SH2 domain, the C-terminal RhoGAP domain and the central C1 domain similar to protein kinase C. When lipid diacylglycerol (DAG) binds to the C1 domain, CHN1 is transferred to the plasma membrane and negatively regulates Rho-family small GTPases RAC1 and CDC42, thus causing the morphological change of axons by pruning the ends of axon dendrites.

Mutational analysis suggests that un-overlapping residues of the RhoGAP domain are involved in RAC1-binding and the RAC1-GAP activity. Regulation of the RhoGAP activity of CHN1 by phorbol esters, natural compounds mimic of the lipid second messenger DAG, presents a possible way of designing agents for therapeutics.

== Clinical significance ==
Heterozygous missense mutations in this gene cause Duane's retraction syndrome 2 (DURS2).
