= High-mobility group =

Group of proteins

High-Mobility Group or HMG is a group of chromosomal proteins that are involved in the regulation of DNA-dependent processes such as transcription, replication, recombination, and DNA repair.

== History and name ==
HMG proteins were originally isolated from mammalian cells, and named according to their electrophoretic mobility in polyacrylamide gels.

== Families ==
The HMG proteins are subdivided into 3 superfamilies each containing a characteristic functional domain:

- HMGA – contains an AT-hook domain
  - HMGA1
  - HMGA2
- HMGB – contains a HMG-box domain
  - HMGB1
  - HMGB2
  - HMGB3
  - HMGB4
- HMGN – contains a nucleosomal binding domain
  - HMGN1
  - HMGN2
  - HMGN3
  - HMGN4
  - HMGN5

Proteins containing any of the above domains embedded in their sequence are known as HMG-motif proteins. HMG-box proteins are found in a variety of eukaryotic organisms.

=== Other families with HMG-box domain ===
- SOX gene family
  - Sex-Determining Region Y Protein
  - SOX1, SOX2, etc.
- TCF/LEF family (T cell factor/lymphoid enhancer factor family)
  - LEF1 (Lymphoid enhancer-binding factor 1)
  - TCF7 (TCF-1)
  - TCF7L1 (TCF-3)
  - TCF7L2 (TCF-4)

== Function ==
HMG proteins are thought to play a significant role in various human disorders. Disruptions and rearrangements in the genes coding for some of the HMG proteins are associated with some common benign tumors. Antibodies to HMG proteins are found in patients with autoimmune diseases. The SRY gene on the Y Chromosome, responsible for male sexual differentiation, contains an HMG-Box domain. A member of the HMG family of proteins, HMGB1, has also been shown to have an extracellular activity as a chemokine, attracting neutrophils and mononuclear inflammatory cells to the infected liver. The high-mobility group protein such as HMO1 alters DNA architecture by binding, bending and looping. Furthermore, these HMG-box DNA-binding proteins increase the flexibility of the DNA upon binding.

In mammalian cells, the HMG non-histone proteins can modulate the activity of major DNA repair pathways including base excision repair, mismatch repair, nucleotide excision repair and double-strand break repair.

== See also ==
- Gene regulatory network
- HMG-box
- Transcription factors
