= TOX2 =

Protein found in humans

Identifiers
- Aliases: TOX2, C20orf100, GCX-1, GCX1, dJ1108D11.2, dJ495O3.1, TOX high mobility group box family member 2
- External IDs: OMIM: 611163; MGI: 3611233; GeneCards: TOX2

Gene location (Human)
Chr.	Chromosome 20 (human)
Band	20q13.12	Start	43,914,852 bp
Band	20q13.12	End	44,069,616 bp

Gene location (Mouse)
Chr.	Chromosome 2 (mouse)
Band	2 H3|2	Start	163,045,045 bp
Band	2 H3|2	End	163,166,090 bp
RNA expression pattern
Bgee	Human / Mouse (ortholog); Top expressed in: secondary oocyte; thymus; gastric mucosa; right lung; lower lobe of lung; upper lobe of lung; upper lobe of left lung; hypothalamus; Descending thoracic aorta; pituitary gland / Top expressed in: cumulus cell; dorsomedial hypothalamic nucleus; median eminence; substantia nigra; suprachiasmatic nucleus; nucleus of stria terminalis; central gray substance of midbrain; mesenteric lymph nodes; ventromedial nucleus; superior colliculus; More reference expression data
BioGPS	n/a
Gene ontology
Molecular function	DNA binding; RNA polymerase II cis-regulatory region sequence-specific DNA binding; DNA-binding transcription activator activity, RNA polymerase II-specific; DNA-binding transcription factor activity, RNA polymerase II-specific
Cellular component	nucleoplasm; nucleus
Biological process	regulation of transcription, DNA-templated; transcription, DNA-templated; transcription by RNA polymerase II; positive regulation of transcription by RNA polymerase II
Sources:Amigo / QuickGO
Orthologs
Databases	NCBI: entry; OMA: entry
Species	Human	Mouse
Entrez	84969	269389
Ensembl	ENSG00000124191	ENSMUSG00000074607
UniProt	Q96NM4	n/a
RefSeq (mRNA)	NM_001098796; NM_001098797; NM_001098798; NM_032883	NM_001098799; NM_001363063; NM_001363064; NM_001372575; NM_001372576 NM_001372577; NM_001372578; NM_001372579; NM_001372580
RefSeq (protein)	NP_001092266; NP_001092267; NP_001092268; NP_116272	n/a
Location (UCSC)	Chr 20: 43.91 – 44.07 Mb	Chr 2: 163.05 – 163.17 Mb
PubMed search
- Wikidata
View/Edit Human	View/Edit Mouse

TOX high mobility group box family member 2, also known as TOX2, is a protein that in humans is encoded by the gene TOX2.

The protein encoded by this gene is a member of a subfamily of transcription factors that also includes TOX, TOX3, and TOX4 that share almost identical HMG-box DNA-binding domains which function to modify chromatin structure.
