= TOX =

Protein-coding gene in the species Homo sapiens

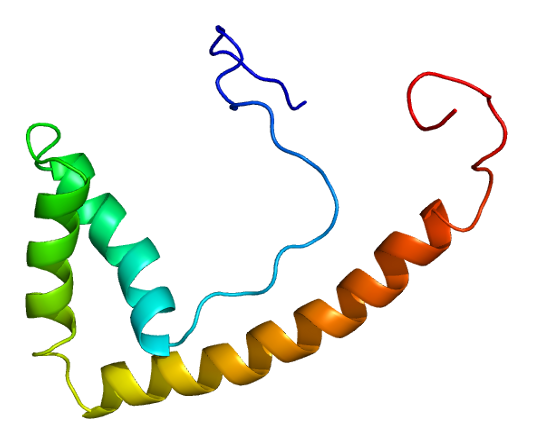

Identifiers
- Aliases: TOX, TOX1, thymocyte selection associated high mobility group box
- External IDs: OMIM: 606863; MGI: 2181659; GeneCards: TOX

Gene location (Human)
Chr.	Chromosome 8 (human)
Band	8q12.1	Start	58,805,412 bp
Band	8q12.1	End	59,119,147 bp

Gene location (Mouse)
Chr.	Chromosome 4 (mouse)
Band	4|4 A1	Start	6,686,353 bp
Band	4|4 A1	End	6,991,557 bp
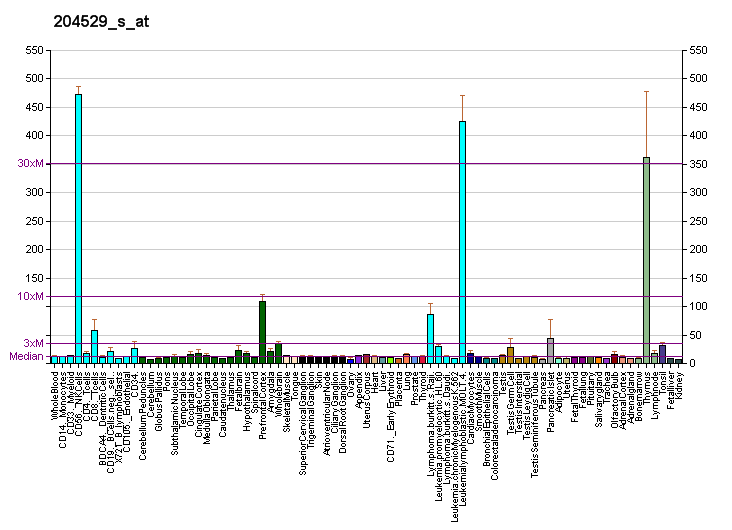

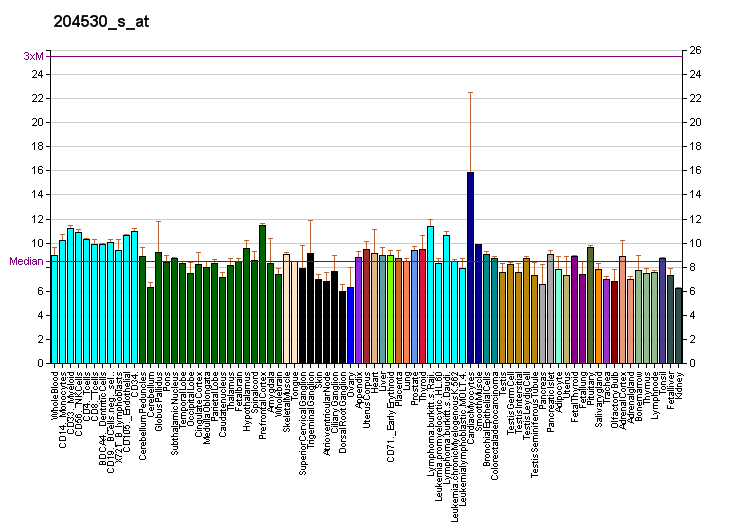
RNA expression pattern
Bgee	Human / Mouse (ortholog); Top expressed in: endothelial cell; ventricular zone; secondary oocyte; thymus; ganglionic eminence; mucosa of sigmoid colon; orbitofrontal cortex; muscle layer of sigmoid colon; islet of Langerhans; dorsolateral prefrontal cortex / Top expressed in: rib; thymus; medial dorsal nucleus; cricoid cartilage; female urethra; Jacobson's organ; medial geniculate nucleus; saccule; zygote; mammillary body; More reference expression data
BioGPS	More reference expression data
Gene ontology
Molecular function	DNA binding; DNA-binding transcription factor activity, RNA polymerase II-specific
Cellular component	nucleus
Biological process	lymphocyte differentiation; positive regulation of natural killer cell differentiation; lymph node development; Peyer's patch development; regulation of transcription by RNA polymerase II
Sources:Amigo / QuickGO
Orthologs
Databases	NCBI: entry; OMA: entry
Species	Human	Mouse
Entrez	9760	252838
Ensembl	ENSG00000198846	ENSMUSG00000041272
UniProt	O94900	Q66JW3
RefSeq (mRNA)	NM_014729	NM_145711; NM_001377078; NM_001377079
RefSeq (protein)	NP_055544	NP_663757; NP_001364007; NP_001364008
Location (UCSC)	Chr 8: 58.81 – 59.12 Mb	Chr 4: 6.69 – 6.99 Mb
PubMed search
- Wikidata
View/Edit Human	View/Edit Mouse

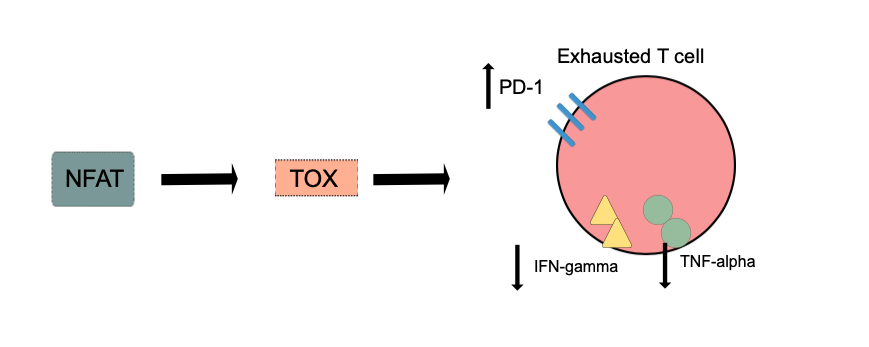
TOX pathway

Thymocyte selection-associated high mobility group box protein TOX is a protein that in humans is encoded by the TOX gene. TOX drives T-cell exhaustion and plays a role in innate lymphoid cell development.

== Structure ==
The TOX gene encodes a protein that belongs to a large superfamily of chromatin associated proteins that share an approximately 75 amino acid DNA binding motif, the HMG (high mobility group)-box (named after that found in the canonical member of the family, high mobility group protein 1). Some high mobility group (HMG) box proteins (e.g., LEF1) contain a single HMG box motif and bind DNA in a sequence-specific manner, while other members of this family (e.g., HMGB1) have multiple HMG boxes and bind DNA in a sequence-independent but structure-dependent manner. While TOX has a single HMG-box motif, it is predicted to bind DNA in a sequence-independent manner.

=== TOX subfamily ===
TOX is a member of a small subfamily of proteins (TOX2, TOX3, and TOX4) that share almost identical HMG-box sequences. TOX2 has been identified to play a role in the differentiation of T follicular helper cell. TOX2 is thought to be a downstream signal of BCL-6. TOX3 has been identified as a breast cancer susceptibility locus. TOX is highly expressed in the thymus, the site of development of T lymphocytes. Knockout mice that lack TOX have a severe defect in development of certain subsets of T lymphocytes.

== Function ==
=== T cell exhaustion ===
TOX is necessary for T cell persistence but also drives T cell exhaustion. An increase in TOX expression is characterized by a weakening of the effector functions of the cytotoxic T cell and upregulation of inhibitory receptors on the cytotoxic T cells. TOX promotes the exhausted T cell phenotype through epigenetic remodeling. PD-1 is an inhibitory marker on T cells that increases when TOX is unregulated. This allows for cancerous cells to evade the cytotoxic T cells through upregulated expression of PD-L1.

==== Effector function ====
Markers of effector functions that are decreased when TOX is overexpressed are KLRG1, TNF, and IFN-gamma. IFN-gamma and TNF-alpha production are also increased when the Tox and Tox2 genes are deleted. Upregulation of effector function in cells lacking TOX is not always seen and it has been proposed that inhibitory receptor function is separated from effector CD8+ cytotoxic T cell function. T-cell exhaustion does not occur when TOX is deleted from CD8+ T cells, but the cells instead adopt the KLRG1+ terminal effector state and undergo apoptosis, or programmed cell death. It was therefore proposed that TOX prevents this terminal differentiation and instead promotes exhaustion so that the T-cell has a slightly more sustained response.

==== Cancer & chronic infection ====
In cancer or during chronic viral infection, T-cell exhaustion occurs when cytotoxic T-cells are constantly stimulated. TOX is upregulated in CD8+ T cells from chronic infection when compared to acute infection. Patients with cancer typically have high levels of TOX in their tumor-infiltrating lymphocytes, and anti-tumor immunity is heightened when Tox and Tox2 are deleted. TOX and TOX2-deficient tumor-specific CAR T cells additionally have increased antitumor effector cell function as well as decreased levels of inhibitory receptors.

==== Activation ====
NFAT transcription factors are essential for activating TOX in CD8+ T-cells, and it has been suggested that TOX is a downstream target of NFAT. The expression and function of NR4a (a target of NFAT) and TOX are strongly linked with reduced NR4a expression in Tox double knockout T cells and minimized Tox expression in NR4a triple knockout T cells.

=== T-cell development ===
TOX is necessary for positive selection in developing thymocytes. Knock out TOX mice shows a requirement of TOX for the CD4 T cell lineage, however CD8 single positive T-cells were still able to develop.

=== Innate lymphoid cells development ===
TOX is necessary for the development of innate lymphoid cells. Innate lymphoid cells include ILC1, ILC2, ILC3 and NK cells.

Notch signaling can aid in the development of all innate lymphoid cells, but in TOX-deficient cells, Notch target genes are expressed at low levels, so it is possible that TOX is required for downstream activation of these Notch target genes. TOX was also found to bind Hes1, a Notch target gene, in embryonic kidney cells.

Several ILC3 populations are reduced in the absence of TOX, implicating TOX's role in their development. In the small intestine, major ILC3 populations are normal in TOX-deficient cells, suggesting that gut ILC3 development may occur independently of TOX. Some ILC3 populations in the gut expand in the absence of TOX.

It has been proposed that NFIL3 and TOX regulate the transition of common lymphoid progenitor to early innate lymphoid progenitor. In NFIL3-deficient mice, the expression of TOX is downregulated, indicating that NFIL3 is directly affecting the expression of TOX which is then acting downstream in ILC development. TOX-deficient mice and NFIL3-deficient mice both lack mature ILCs and ILC progenitors.
