= LHFPL6 =

Protein-coding gene in humans

Identifiers
- Aliases: LHFPL6, LHFP, lipoma HMGIC fusion partner, LHFPL tetraspan subfamily member 6
- External IDs: OMIM: 606710; MGI: 1920048; GeneCards: LHFPL6

Gene location (Human)
| Chr. | Chromosome 13 (human) |
| Band | 13q13.3-q14.11 | Start | 39,209,116 bp |
| Band | 13q13.3-q14.11 | End | 39,603,528 bp |

Gene location (Mouse)
| Chr. | Chromosome 3 (mouse) |
| Band | 3|3 C | Start | 52,948,949 bp |
| Band | 3|3 C | End | 53,169,100 bp |
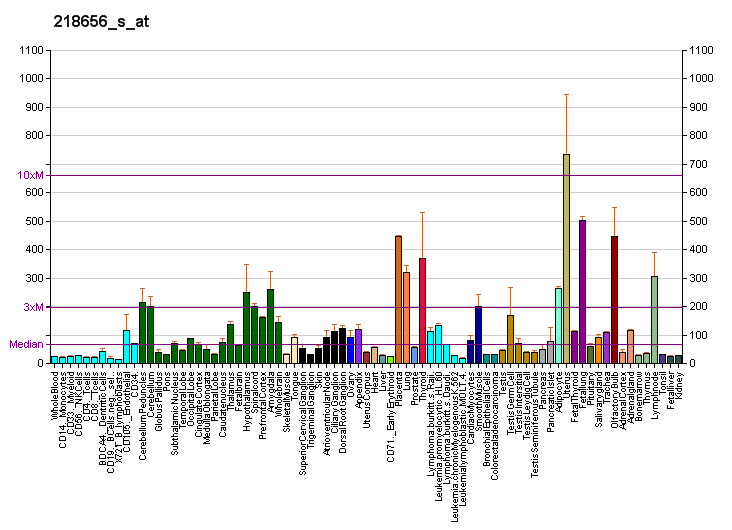
RNA expression pattern
| Bgee | Human / Mouse (ortholog); Top expressed in: vena cava; Achilles tendon; synovial joint; right coronary artery; superficial temporal artery; saphenous vein; tibial nerve; cerebellar vermis; left coronary artery; Descending thoracic aorta / Top expressed in: ascending aorta; aortic valve; molar; endothelial cell of lymphatic vessel; right lung; hand; calvaria; right lung lobe; body of femur; sciatic nerve; More reference expression data |
| BioGPS | More reference expression data |
Orthologs
| Databases | NCBI: entry; OMA: entry |
| Species | Human | Mouse |
| Entrez | 10186 | 108927 |
| Ensembl | ENSG00000183722 | ENSMUSG00000048332 |
| UniProt | Q9Y693 | Q8BM86 |
| RefSeq (mRNA) | NM_005780 | NM_175386 |
| RefSeq (protein) | NP_005771 | NP_780595 |
| Location (UCSC) | Chr 13: 39.21 – 39.6 Mb | Chr 3: 52.95 – 53.17 Mb |
| PubMed search |
- Wikidata
| View/Edit Human | View/Edit Mouse |

LHFPL tetraspan subfamily member 6 protein is a protein that in humans is encoded by the LHFPL6 gene (previously LHFP).

This gene is a member of the lipoma HMGIC fusion partner (LHFP) gene family, which is a subset of the superfamily of tetraspan transmembrane protein encoding genes. This gene is fused to a high-mobility group gene in a translocation-associated lipoma. Mutations in another LHFP-like gene (LHFPL1, LHFPL2) result in deafness in humans and mice. Alternatively spliced transcript variants have been found; however, their full-length nature is not known.
