= TOX3 =

Protein found in humans

Identifiers
- Aliases: TOX3, CAGF9, TNRC9, TOX high mobility group box family member 3
- External IDs: OMIM: 611416; MGI: 3039593; GeneCards: TOX3

Gene location (Human)
Chr.	Chromosome 16 (human)
Band	16q12.1	Start	52,436,417 bp
Band	16q12.1	End	52,547,802 bp

Gene location (Mouse)
Chr.	Chromosome 8 (mouse)
Band	8 C4|8 43.96 cM	Start	90,973,668 bp
Band	8 C4|8 43.96 cM	End	91,074,971 bp
RNA expression pattern
Bgee	Human / Mouse (ortholog); Top expressed in: mucosa of sigmoid colon; pancreatic ductal cell; ventricular zone; bronchial epithelial cell; jejunal mucosa; mucosa of paranasal sinus; kidney tubule; endothelial cell; embryo; ganglionic eminence / Top expressed in: Rostral migratory stream; medial ganglionic eminence; lacrimal gland; piriform cortex; epithelium of lens; ventricular zone; ventromedial nucleus; lobe of prostate; anterior amygdaloid area; medial dorsal nucleus; More reference expression data
BioGPS	n/a
Gene ontology
Molecular function	DNA binding; estrogen response element binding; phosphoprotein binding; chromatin binding; protein binding; protein homodimerization activity; DNA-binding transcription factor activity, RNA polymerase II-specific
Cellular component	nucleus
Biological process	negative regulation of neuron apoptotic process; positive regulation of transcription, DNA-templated; regulation of transcription, DNA-templated; transcription, DNA-templated; apoptotic process; regulation of apoptotic process; regulation of transcription by RNA polymerase II
Sources:Amigo / QuickGO
Orthologs
Databases	NCBI: entry; OMA: entry
Species	Human	Mouse
Entrez	27324	244579
Ensembl	ENSG00000103460	ENSMUSG00000043668
UniProt	O15405	Q80W03
RefSeq (mRNA)	NM_001080430; NM_001146188	NM_172913
RefSeq (protein)	NP_001073899; NP_001139660	NP_766501
Location (UCSC)	Chr 16: 52.44 – 52.55 Mb	Chr 8: 90.97 – 91.07 Mb
PubMed search
- Wikidata
View/Edit Human	View/Edit Mouse

TOX high mobility group box family member 3, also known as TOX3, is a protein that in humans is encoded by the gene TOX3.

The protein encoded by this gene is a member of a subfamily of transcription factors that also includes TOX, TOX2, and TOX4 that share almost identical HMG-box DNA-binding domains which function to modify chromatin structure by unwinding and bending DNA. The protein TOX3 has a glutamine-rich C-terminus due to CAG repeats. TOX3 is located on human chromosome band 16q12.1. The gene consists of seven exons and is highly expressed in both the brain and luminal epithelial breast tissue. Mutations in the gene are associated with increased susceptibility to breast cancer. TOX3 plays a role in regulating calcium-dependent transcription and interacts with cAMP-response-element-binding protein (CREB) and CREB-binding protein (CBP). It also increases transcription via interaction with CITED1, a transcription co-regulator that increases transcription factor activity.

== Disease linkage ==
Mutations in the TOX3 gene are associated with an increased risk of breast cancer.

The risk allele rs3803662 is a low-penetrance SNP (single nucleotide polymorphism) associated with decreased expression of TOX3 and an increase in breast cancer risk. The risk locus was reported to regulate affinity of FOXA1 binding to chromatin, potentially affecting TOX3 expression. This locus also interacts with high-penetrance mutations BRCA1 and BRCA2 to increase risk. The rs3803662 variant has a high frequency in the population, with a minor allele frequency of 0.25.

Little is known of the transcriptional mechanisms and protein interactions of TOX3. However, a 2019 publication identified TOX3 as a cancer suppressor gene in clear cell renal cell carcinoma (ccRCC) and reported that downregulation of TOX3 facilitates the epithelial mesenchymal transition by decreasing repression of SNAI1 and SNAI2, resulting in tumor growth and metastasis. Like breast cancer, downregulation of TOX3 is associated with worse prognosis in ccRCC patients.
