= LHFPL3 =

Protein-coding gene in the species Homo sapiens

Identifiers
- Aliases: LHFPL3, LHFPL4, lipoma HMGIC fusion partner-like 3, LHFPL tetraspan subfamily member 3
- External IDs: OMIM: 609719; MGI: 1925076; GeneCards: LHFPL3

Gene location (Human)
Chr.	Chromosome 7 (human)
Band	7q22.2-q22.3	Start	104,328,603 bp
Band	7q22.2-q22.3	End	104,908,561 bp

Gene location (Mouse)
Chr.	Chromosome 5 (mouse)
Band	5|5 A3	Start	22,951,057 bp
Band	5|5 A3	End	23,480,595 bp
RNA expression pattern
Bgee	Human / Mouse (ortholog); Top expressed in: lateral nuclear group of thalamus; subthalamic nucleus; inferior ganglion of vagus nerve; ventral tegmental area; external globus pallidus; amygdala; corpus callosum; Brodmann area 46; hypothalamus; superior vestibular nucleus / Top expressed in: globus pallidus; habenula; deep cerebellar nuclei; medial dorsal nucleus; dorsal tegmental nucleus; dorsomedial hypothalamic nucleus; ventromedial nucleus; lateral hypothalamus; inferior colliculi; superior colliculus; More reference expression data
BioGPS	n/a
Orthologs
Databases	NCBI: entry; OMA: entry
Species	Human	Mouse
Entrez	375612	269629
Ensembl	ENSG00000187416	ENSMUSG00000106379
UniProt	Q86UP9	Q9CTN8
RefSeq (mRNA)	NM_199000; NM_001386065	NM_001081231; NM_029990; NM_001359998
RefSeq (protein)	NP_945351	NP_001074700; NP_084266; NP_001346927
Location (UCSC)	Chr 7: 104.33 – 104.91 Mb	Chr 5: 22.95 – 23.48 Mb
PubMed search
- Wikidata
View/Edit Human	View/Edit Mouse

LHFPL tetraspan subfamily member 3 is a protein that in humans is encoded by the LHFPL3 gene.

== Function ==
This gene is a member of the lipoma HMGIC fusion partner (LHFP) gene family, which is a subset of the superfamily of tetraspan transmembrane protein encoding genes. Mutations in one LHFP-like gene result in deafness in humans and mice, and a second LHFP-like gene is fused to a high-mobility group gene in a translocation-associated lipoma. A partial gene fragment named LHFPL4 corresponds to a portion of the first exon of this gene. [provided by RefSeq, Jul 2008].
