= HMGA =

Family of high mobility group proteins

high mobility group AT-hook 1

Identifiers
- Symbol: HMGA1
- Alt. symbols: HMGIY
- NCBI gene: 3159
- HGNC: 5010
- OMIM: 600701
- RefSeq: NM_145901
- UniProt: P17096

Other data
- Locus: Chr. 6 p21
Search for
- Structures: Swiss-model
- Domains: InterPro

high mobility group AT-hook 2

Identifiers
- Symbol: HMGA2
- Alt. symbols: HMGIC
- NCBI gene: 8091
- HGNC: 5009
- OMIM: 600698
- RefSeq: NM_003484
- UniProt: P52926

Other data
- Locus: Chr. 12 q15
Search for
- Structures: Swiss-model
- Domains: InterPro

HMGA is a family of high mobility group proteins characterized by an AT-hook. They code for a "small, nonhistone, chromatin-associated protein that has no intrinsic transcriptional activity but can modulate transcription by altering the chromatin architecture". Mammals have two orthologs: HMGA1 and HMGA2.

== Genomic distribution ==
In mouse embryonic stem cells it has been demonstrated that both HMGA proteins binds uniformly to the DNA due to their AT-hook domains, with a slight preference for AT-rich regions/ Such regions tend to lack coding genes, an observation that argues against a direct role in transcriptional control and in agreement with previous studies, suggest that these proteins have a structural role in the chromatin, similar to histone.

== Function ==
Normally, when cells are subjected to increased DNA damage (such as the formation of 6-O-methylguanine) this causes an increase in apoptosis (programmed cell death). However, cells with diminished activity for either proteins HMGA1 or HMGA2 (or both together) are more tolerant of such DNA damage than cells in which these proteins are not diminished. Thus a normal function of the HMGA1 and HMGA2 proteins appears to be to signal the presence of DNA damage leading to induction of apoptosis.

== Association with human traits ==
Variations in HMGA2 to have a moderate association with adult height.

== See also ==
- HMGA1
- HMGA2
