= HMGA2 =

Protein found in humans

Identifiers
- Aliases: HMGA2, BABL, HMGI-C, HMGIC, LIPO, STQTL9, high mobility group AT-hook 2, SRS5
- External IDs: OMIM: 600698; MGI: 101761; GeneCards: HMGA2

Gene location (Human)
Chr.	Chromosome 12 (human)
Band	12q14.3	Start	65,824,460 bp
Band	12q14.3	End	65,966,291 bp

Gene location (Mouse)
Chr.	Chromosome 10 (mouse)
Band	10 D2|10 67.94 cM	Start	120,197,180 bp
Band	10 D2|10 67.94 cM	End	120,312,374 bp
RNA expression pattern
Bgee	Human / Mouse (ortholog); Top expressed in: sural nerve; embryo; stromal cell of endometrium; ventricular zone; cartilage tissue; ganglionic eminence; testicle; retinal pigment epithelium; buccal mucosa cell; amniotic fluid / Top expressed in: genital tubercle; endothelial cell of lymphatic vessel; tail of embryo; abdominal wall; maxillary prominence; mandibular prominence; primitive streak; somite; hand; medullary collecting duct; More reference expression data
BioGPS	n/a
Gene ontology
Molecular function	DNA binding; DNA-dependent protein kinase activity; MH1 domain binding; 5'-deoxyribose-5-phosphate lyase activity; minor groove of adenine-thymine-rich DNA binding; DNA-binding transcription activator activity, RNA polymerase II-specific; transcription factor binding; C2H2 zinc finger domain binding; DNA-binding transcription repressor activity, RNA polymerase II-specific; MH2 domain binding; protein binding; DNA-(apurinic or apyrimidinic site) endonuclease activity; nucleosomal DNA binding; DNA binding, bending; SMAD binding; cAMP response element binding; RNA polymerase II cis-regulatory region sequence-specific DNA binding; DNA-binding transcription factor activity, RNA polymerase II-specific; transcription coregulator activity
Cellular component	SMAD protein complex; senescence-associated heterochromatin focus; nuclear chromosome; protein-DNA complex; chromatin; nucleus; nucleoplasm
Biological process	positive regulation of transcription by RNA polymerase II; positive regulation of transcription regulatory region DNA binding; regulation of cell cycle process; regulation of transcription, DNA-templated; endodermal cell differentiation; chondrocyte differentiation; regulation of cellular response to drug; negative regulation of DNA binding; response to virus; regulation of stem cell population maintenance; negative regulation of apoptotic process; positive regulation of cellular response to X-ray; negative regulation of transcription by RNA polymerase II; chromatin organization; heterochromatin assembly; oncogene-induced cell senescence; stem cell differentiation; transcription, DNA-templated; multicellular organism development; positive regulation of transcription, DNA-templated; negative regulation by host of viral transcription; cell division; positive regulation of gene expression; mesenchymal cell differentiation; chromosome condensation; negative regulation of double-strand break repair via nonhomologous end joining; chondrocyte proliferation; positive regulation of cellular senescence; positive regulation of response to DNA damage stimulus; epithelial to mesenchymal transition; positive regulation of apoptotic process; mesodermal cell differentiation; regulation of growth; cell cycle; mitotic G2 DNA damage checkpoint signaling; negative regulation of transcription, DNA-templated; positive regulation of stem cell proliferation; fat cell differentiation; chromosome breakage; mesodermal-endodermal cell signaling; base-excision repair; negative regulation of single stranded viral RNA replication via double stranded DNA intermediate; transcription by RNA polymerase II; positive regulation of angiogenesis; positive regulation of cell proliferation in bone marrow; negative regulation of cellular senescence; positive regulation of protein serine/threonine kinase activity
Sources:Amigo / QuickGO
Orthologs
Databases	NCBI: entry; OMA: entry
Species	Human	Mouse
Entrez	8091	15364
Ensembl	ENSG00000149948	ENSMUSG00000056758
UniProt	P52926	P52927
RefSeq (mRNA)	NM_003484; NM_001015886; NM_001300918; NM_001300919; NM_003483 NM_001330190	NM_010441; NM_001347170
RefSeq (protein)	NP_001287847; NP_001287848; NP_001317119; NP_003474; NP_003475	NP_001334099; NP_034571
Location (UCSC)	Chr 12: 65.82 – 65.97 Mb	Chr 10: 120.2 – 120.31 Mb
PubMed search
- Wikidata
View/Edit Human	View/Edit Mouse

High-mobility group AT-hook 2, also known as HMGA2, is a protein that, in humans, is encoded by the HMGA2 gene.

== Function ==
This gene encodes a protein that belongs to the non-histone chromosomal high-mobility group (HMG) protein family. HMG proteins function as architectural factors and are essential components of the enhanceosome. This protein contains structural DNA-binding domains and may act as a transcriptional regulating factor. Identification of the deletion, amplification, and rearrangement of this gene that are associated with lipomas suggests a role in adipogenesis and mesenchymal differentiation. A gene knock-out study of the mouse counterpart demonstrated that this gene is involved in diet-induced obesity. Alternate transcriptional splice variants, encoding different isoforms, have been characterized.

The expression of HMGA2 in adult tissues is commonly associated with both malignant and benign tumor formation, as well as certain characteristic cancer-promoting mutations. Homologous proteins with highly conserved sequences are found in other mammalian species, including lab mice (Mus musculus).

HMGA2 contains three basic DNA-binding domains (AT-hooks) that cause the protein to bind to adenine-thymine (AT)-rich regions of nuclear DNA. HMGA2 does not directly promote or inhibit the transcription of any genes, but alters the structure of DNA and promotes the assembly of protein complexes that do regulate the transcription of genes. With few exceptions, HMGA2 is expressed in humans only during early development, and is reduced to undetectable or nearly undetectable levels of transcription in adult tissues. The microRNA let-7 is largely responsible for this time-dependent regulation of HMGA2. The apparent function of HMGA2 in proliferation and differentiation of cells during development is supported by the observation that mice with mutant HMGA2 genes are unusually small (the pygmy or mini-mouse phenotype), and genome-wide association studies linking HMGA2-associated SNPs to variation in human height.

== Regulation by let-7 ==
Let-7 inhibits production of specific proteins by complementary binding to their mRNA transcripts. The HMGA2 mature mRNA transcript contains seven regions complementary or nearly complementary to let-7 in its 3' untranslated region (UTR). Let-7 expression is very low during early human development, which coincides with the greatest transcription of HMGA2. The time-dependent drop in HMGA2 expression is caused by a rise in let-7 expression.

== Clinical significance ==
=== Relationship with cancer ===
Heightened expression of HMGA2 is found in a variety of human cancers, but the precise mechanism by which HMGA2 contributes to the formation of cancer is unknown. The same mutations that lead to pituitary adenomas in mice can be found in similar cancers in humans. Its presence is associated with poor prognosis for the patient, but also with sensitization of the cancer cells to certain forms of cancer therapy. To be specific, HMGA2-high cancers display an abnormally strong response to double strand breaks in DNA caused by radiation therapy and some forms of chemotherapy. Artificial addition of HMGA2 to some forms of cancer unresponsive to DNA damage cause them to respond to the treatment instead, although the mechanism by which this phenomenon occurs is also not understood. However, the expression of HMGA2 is also associated with increased rates of metastasis in breast cancer, and both metastasis and recurrence of squamous cell carcinoma. These properties are responsible for patients' poor prognoses. As with HMGA2's effects on the response to radiation and chemotherapy, the mechanism by which HMGA2 exerts these effects is unknown.

A very common finding in HMGA2-high cancers is the under-expression of let-7. This is not unexpected, given let-7's natural role in the regulation of HMGA2. However, many cancers are found with normal levels of let-7 that are also HMGA2 high. Many of these cancers express the normal HMGA2 protein, but the mature mRNA transcript is truncated, missing a portion of the 3'UTR that contains the critical let-7 complementary regions. Without these, let-7 is unable to bind to HMGA2 mRNA, and, thus, is unable to repress it. The truncated mRNAs may arise from a chromosomal translocation that results in loss of a portion of the HMGA2 gene.

=== ERCC1 ===
Overexpressed HMGA2 may play a role in the frequent repression of ERCC1 in cancers. The let-7a miRNA normally represses the HMGA2 gene, and in normal adult tissues, almost no HMGA2 protein is present. (See also Let-7 microRNA precursor.) Reduction or absence of let-7a miRNA allows high expression of the HMGA2 protein. As shown by Borrmann et al., HMGA2 targets and modifies the chromatin architecture at the ERCC1 gene, reducing its expression. These authors noted that repression of ERCC1 (by HGMA2) can reduce DNA repair, leading to increased genome instability.

ERCC1 protein expression is reduced or absent in 84% to 100% of human colorectal cancers. ERCC1 protein expression was also reduced in a diet-related mouse model of colon cancer. As indicated in the ERCC1 article, however, two other epigenetic mechanisms of repression of ERCC1 also may have a role in reducing expression of ERCC1 (promoter DNA methylation and microRNA repression).

=== Chromatin immunoprecipitation ===
Genome-wide analysis of HMGA2 target genes was performed by chromatin immunoprecipitation in a gastric cell line with overexpressed HMGA2, and 1,366 genes were identified as potential targets. The pathways they identified as associated with malignant neoplasia progression were the adherens junction pathway, MAPK signaling pathway, Wnt signaling pathway, p53 signaling pathway, VEGF signaling pathway, Notch signaling pathway, and TGF beta signaling pathway.

=== Non-homologous end joining DNA repair ===
Overexpression of HMGA2 delayed the release of DNA-PKcs (needed for non-homologous end joining DNA repair) from double strand break sites. Overexpression of HMGA2 alone was sufficient to induce chromosomal aberrations, a hallmark of deficiency in NHEJ-mediated DNA repair. These properties implicate HMGA2 in the promotion of genome instability and tumorigenesis. showed that

=== Base excision repair pathway ===
HMGA2 protein can cleave DNA containing apurinic/apyrimidinic (AP) sites (is an AP lyase). In addition, this protein also possesses the related 5’-deoxyribosyl phosphate (dRP) lyase activity. An interaction between human AP endonuclease 1 and HMGA2 in cancer cells has been demonstrated indicating that HMGA2 can be incorporated into the cellular base excision repair (BER) machinery. Increased expression of HMGA2 increased BER, and allowed cells with increased HMGA2 to be resistant to hydroxyurea, a chemotherapeutic agent for solid tumors.

== Interactions ==
HMGA2 has been shown to interact with PIAS3 and NFKB1.

The transport of HMGA2 to the nucleus is mediated by an interaction between its second AT-hook and importin-α2.

== See also ==
- HMGA
- Lethal dwarfism in rabbits, due to a loss of function (LOF) mutation in the rabbit HMGA2 gene
