= Michael Bustin =

American molecular biologist (1937–2025)

- Born: 19 April 1937; Bucharest, Romania
- Died: 24 August 2025 (aged 88)
- Citizenship: American
- Education: University of Denver (BA); University of California, Berkeley (PhD)
- Scientific career
- Fields: Molecular Biology
- Workplaces: Rockefeller University; Weitzman Institute; Georgetown University; Tel Aviv University; National Institutes of Health
- Thesis: Specificity and multiplicity of histone structures (1969)
- Doctoral advisor: R. D. Cole
- Website: ccr.cancer.gov/staff-directory/michael-bustin

Michael Bustin (19 April 1937 – 24 August 2025) was a Romanian-American senior investigator at the National Cancer Institute, National Institutes of Health (NIH). His research centered around the role of chromosomal proteins in chromatin function, epigenetic regulation, development, and disease.

== Life and career ==
Bustin was born in Romania on 19 April 1937. After the Second World War, he emigrated to Israel, grew up in a communal settlement, and served in the IDF. He received his BSc from University of Denver and his Ph.D. from the University of California, Berkeley. He did postdoctoral work in protein chemistry in the laboratory of Nobel laureates Stanford Moore and William Howard Stein at the Rockefeller University in New York, and in immunochemistry at the Weizmann Institute of Science, Israel, where he produced antibodies to histones, and pioneered their use for studies on chromatin structure and function.

He joined NIH in 1975, where he was a senior investigator and section chief for the protein section at the National Cancer Institute (NCI). He was also an adjunct professor at Georgetown University (1984-1990) and a visiting professor at Tel Aviv University, Israel. He focused on studying the biological function and mechanism of action of nucleosome-binding proteins, with specific emphasis on Histone H1 and HMGN proteins.

Bustin was an adjunct professor at Georgetown University (1984–1990), and a visiting professor at Tel Aviv University, Israel. He published over 275 scientific articles.

Bustin died on 24 August 2025, at the age of 88.

== Awards and honors ==
Bustin has received the following awards and honors:

- Jacob and Lena Joels Foundation Visiting Professorship Award from the Hebrew University (2007)
- Humboldt Research Award from the Alexander von Humboldt Foundation, Germany (1997)
- 1993 Tosse-Preis fur Kinderrheumatologie from the German Rheumatology Society (1993)
- NIH Award from NCI (1989)
- Janett and Samuel Lubell Prize from the Weizmann Institute (1975)
