= HMGA1 =

Protein-coding gene in the species Homo sapiens

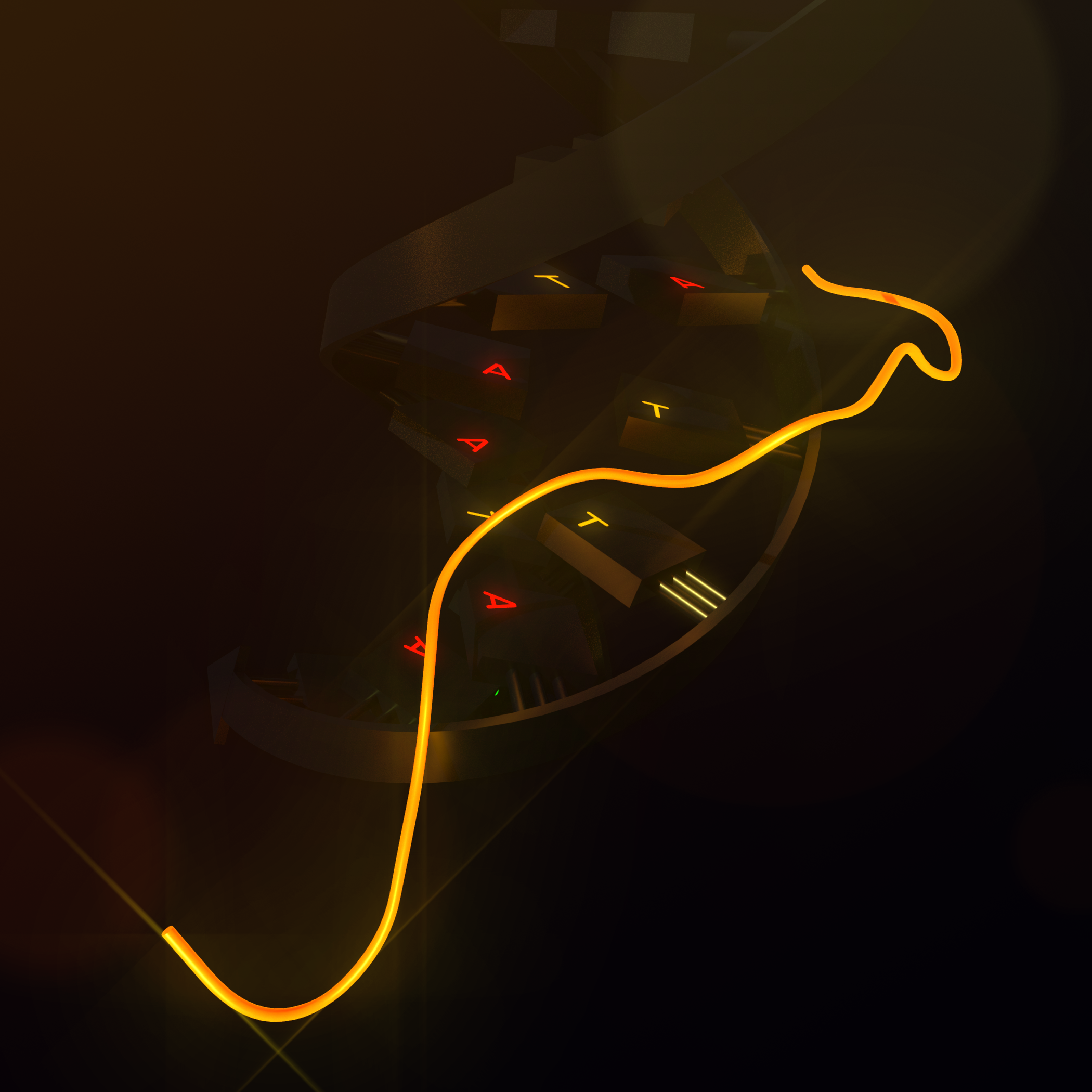

Identifiers
- Aliases: HMGA1, HMG-R, HMGA1A, HMGIY, high mobility group AT-hook 1
- External IDs: OMIM: 600701; MGI: 96160; GeneCards: HMGA1
Available structures
PDB	Ortholog search: PDBe RCSB
PDB	List of PDB id codes 2EZD, 2EZE, 2EZF, 2EZG

Gene location (Human)
Chr.	Chromosome 6 (human)
Band	6p21.31	Start	34,236,873 bp
Band	6p21.31	End	34,246,231 bp

Gene location (Mouse)
Chr.	Chromosome 17 (mouse)
Band	17 A3.3|17 14.5 cM	Start	27,775,471 bp
Band	17 A3.3|17 14.5 cM	End	27,782,648 bp
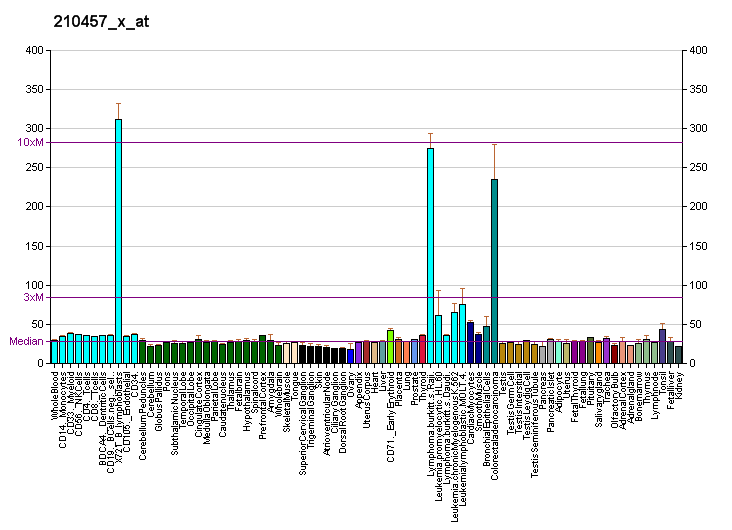

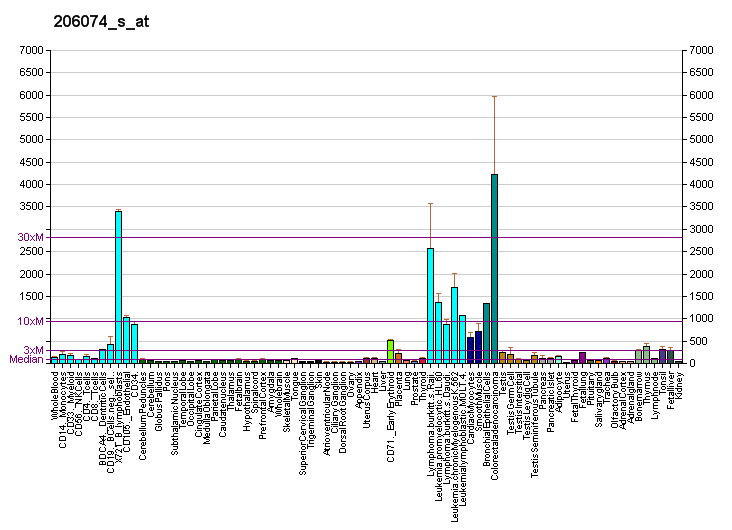
RNA expression pattern
Bgee	Human / Mouse (ortholog); Top expressed in: cartilage tissue; embryo; mucosa of pharynx; ganglionic eminence; skin of abdomen; thymus; mucosa of transverse colon; skin of leg; nipple; appendix / Top expressed in: epiblast; tail of embryo; yolk sac; genital tubercle; embryo; embryo; secondary oocyte; zygote; lip; ventricular zone; More reference expression data
BioGPS	More reference expression data
Gene ontology
Molecular function	retinoid X receptor binding; retinoic acid receptor binding; enzyme binding; peroxisome proliferator activated receptor binding; DNA binding; DNA-binding transcription activator activity, RNA polymerase II-specific; nuclear receptor coactivator activity; protein binding; chromatin binding; DNA-binding transcription factor activity; 5'-deoxyribose-5-phosphate lyase activity; transcription factor binding; DNA-(apurinic or apyrimidinic site) endonuclease activity; cis-regulatory region sequence-specific DNA binding; minor groove of adenine-thymine-rich DNA binding; DNA-binding transcription factor activity, RNA polymerase II-specific; transcription coactivator activity; structural constituent of chromatin
Cellular component	nucleus; nucleoplasm; cytosol; senescence-associated heterochromatin focus; chromosome; focal adhesion; transcription regulator complex; chromatin; RNA polymerase II transcription regulator complex
Biological process	negative regulation of cell population proliferation; oncogene-induced cell senescence; establishment of integrated proviral latency; nucleosome disassembly; regulation of transcription, DNA-templated; positive regulation of transcription, DNA-templated; positive regulation of transcription by RNA polymerase II; positive regulation of cellular senescence; negative regulation of transcription, DNA-templated; response to virus; DNA unwinding involved in DNA replication; transcription, DNA-templated; transcription by RNA polymerase II; nuclear transport; viral process; base-excision repair; protein-containing complex assembly
Sources:Amigo / QuickGO
Orthologs
Databases	NCBI: entry; OMA: entry
Species	Human	Mouse
Entrez	3159	15361
Ensembl	ENSG00000137309	ENSMUSG00000046711
UniProt	P17096	P17095
RefSeq (mRNA)	NM_002131; NM_145899; NM_145901; NM_145902; NM_145903 NM_145904; NM_145905; NM_001319077; NM_001319078; NM_001319079; NM_001319080; NM_001319081; NM_001319082	NM_001025427; NM_001039356; NM_001166535; NM_001166536; NM_001166537 NM_001166539; NM_001166540; NM_001166541; NM_001166542; NM_001166543; NM_001166544; NM_001166545; NM_001166546; NM_016660
RefSeq (protein)	NP_001306006; NP_001306007; NP_001306008; NP_001306009; NP_001306010 NP_001306011; NP_002122; NP_665906; NP_665908; NP_665909; NP_665910; NP_665912	NP_001159948; NP_001159949; NP_001020598; NP_001034445; NP_001160007 NP_001160008; NP_001160009; NP_001160011; NP_001160012; NP_001160013; NP_001160014; NP_001160015; NP_001160016; NP_001160017; NP_001160018; NP_057869
Location (UCSC)	Chr 6: 34.24 – 34.25 Mb	Chr 17: 27.78 – 27.78 Mb
PubMed search
- Wikidata
View/Edit Human	View/Edit Mouse

High-mobility group protein HMG-I/HMG-Y is a protein that in humans is encoded by the HMGA1 gene.

== Function ==
This gene encodes a non-histone chromatin protein involved in many cellular processes, including regulation of inducible gene transcription, DNA replication, heterochromatin organization, integration of retroviruses into chromosomes, and the metastatic progression of cancer cells.

HMGA1 proteins are quite small (~10-12 kDa) and basic molecules, and consist of three AT-hooks with the RGRP (Arg-Gly-Arg-Pro) core motif, a novel cross-linking domain located between the second and third AT-hook, and a C-terminal acidic tail characteristic for the HMG family comprising HMGA, HMGB and HMGN proteins.

HMGA1-GFP fusion proteins are highly dynamic in vivo (determined using FRAP analysis), but in contrast also show nanomolar affinity to AT-rich DNA in vitro (determined biochemically), which might be explained due to the extensive post-transcriptional modifications in vivo. HMGA1 preferentially binds to the minor groove of AT-rich regions in double-stranded DNA using its AT-hooks. It has little secondary structure in solution but assumes distinct conformations when bound to substrates such as DNA or other proteins. HMGA1 proteins have high amounts of diverse posttranslational modifications and are located mainly in the nucleus, especially in heterochromatin, but also in mitochondria and the cytoplasm.

Recently it has been shown that HMGA1 proteins, HMGA1a and HMGA1b, can cross-link DNA fibers in vitro and can induce chromatin clustering in vivo suggesting a structural role of HMGA1 proteins in heterochromatin organization.

At least seven transcript variants encoding two different isoforms (HMGA1a, HMGA1b) have been found for this gene. The splice variant HMGA1c with only two AT hooks and no acidic tail is in discussion to be a real member of the HMGA family.

Mice lacking their variant of HMGA1, i.e., Hmga1-/- mice, are diabetic, show a cardiac hypertrophy and express low levels of the insulin receptor.

== Interactions ==
HMGA1 has been shown to interact with CEBPB and Sp1 transcription factor.

== See also ==
- HMGA
- AT-hook
