= TCF7L1 =

Protein-coding gene in the species Homo sapiens

Identifiers
- Aliases: TCF7L1, TCF-3, TCF3, transcription factor 7 like 1
- External IDs: OMIM: 604652; MGI: 1202876; GeneCards: TCF7L1

Gene location (Human)
Chr.	Chromosome 2 (human)
Band	2p11.2	Start	85,133,392 bp
Band	2p11.2	End	85,310,387 bp

Gene location (Mouse)
Chr.	Chromosome 6 (mouse)
Band	6 C1|6 32.27 cM	Start	72,603,361 bp
Band	6 C1|6 32.27 cM	End	72,766,237 bp
RNA expression pattern
Bgee	Human / Mouse (ortholog); Top expressed in: popliteal artery; tibial arteries; gastric mucosa; ascending aorta; Descending thoracic aorta; subcutaneous adipose tissue; left lobe of thyroid gland; canal of the cervix; right lobe of thyroid gland; right coronary artery / Top expressed in: internal carotid artery; external carotid artery; genital tubercle; vas deferens; left colon; ankle joint; epiblast; tunica media of zone of aorta; abdominal wall; ciliary body; More reference expression data
BioGPS	n/a
Gene ontology
Molecular function	sequence-specific DNA binding; beta-catenin binding; DNA binding; DNA-binding transcription factor activity; DNA-binding transcription factor activity, RNA polymerase II-specific; chromatin binding
Cellular component	transcription regulator complex; nucleus; nucleoplasm; cytosol
Biological process	regulation of Wnt signaling pathway; chromatin organization; Wnt signaling pathway; transcription, DNA-templated; canonical Wnt signaling pathway; regulation of transcription by RNA polymerase II; regulation of transcription, DNA-templated; beta-catenin-TCF complex assembly
Sources:Amigo / QuickGO
Orthologs
Databases	NCBI: entry; OMA: entry
Species	Human	Mouse
Entrez	83439	21415
Ensembl	ENSG00000152284	ENSMUSG00000055799
UniProt	Q9HCS4	Q9Z1J1
RefSeq (mRNA)	NM_031283	NM_001079822; NM_009332
RefSeq (protein)	NP_112573	NP_001073290; NP_033358
Location (UCSC)	Chr 2: 85.13 – 85.31 Mb	Chr 6: 72.6 – 72.77 Mb
PubMed search
- Wikidata
View/Edit Human	View/Edit Mouse

Transcription factor 7-like 1, also known as TCF7L1, is a human gene.

This gene encodes a member of the T cell factor/lymphoid enhancer factor family of transcription factors. These transcription factors are activated by beta catenin, mediate the Wnt signaling pathway and are antagonized by the transforming growth factor beta signaling pathway. The encoded protein contains a high mobility group-box DNA binding domain and participates in the regulation of cell cycle genes and cellular senescence.
