= TCF/LEF family =

Group of genes

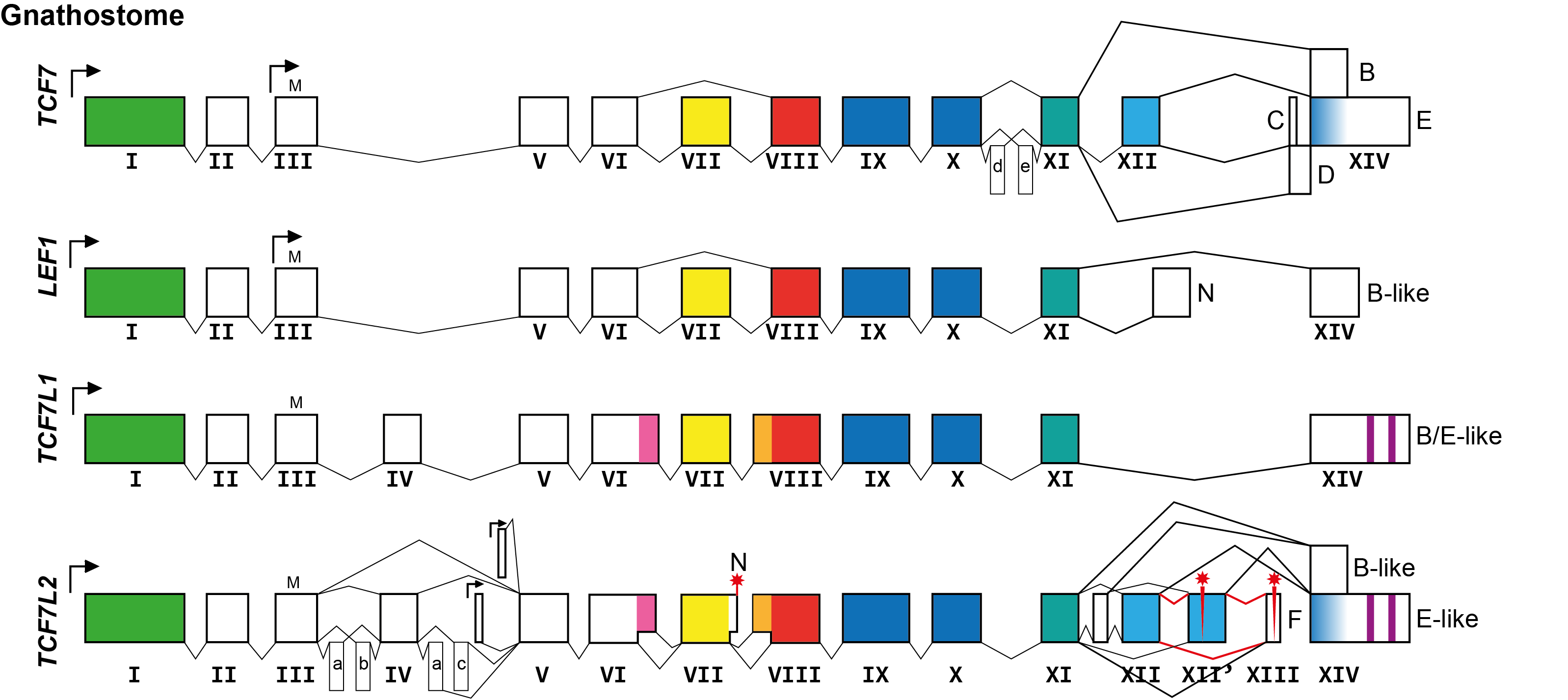
Composite gene models of TCF/LEF genes. Extracted from Torres-Aguila et al. (2022).

The TCF/LEF family (T cell factor/lymphoid enhancer factor family) is a group of genes that encode transcription factors which bind to DNA through a SOX-like high mobility group domain. They are involved in the Wnt signaling pathway, particularly during embryonic and stem-cell development, but also had been found to play a role in cancer and diabetes. TCF/LEF factors recruit the coactivator beta-catenin to enhancer elements of genes they target. They can also recruit members of the Groucho family of corepressors.

== History ==
The discovery of the TCF/LEF genes as nuclear Wnt pathway components in the 1990s was a pivotal breakthrough for the Wnt signalling research field, plugging an important knowledge gap and enabling subsequent understanding of transcriptional regulation of Wnt target genes, particularly in embryonic development and cancer.

Before this discovery, it was only known that upstream Wnt signalling mechanisms regulated the cytoplasmic abundance of the beta-catenin protein, which as a consequence translocated into the cell nucleus. However, since the protein structure of beta-catenin did not reveal any DNA-binding domain, it was still unclear how nuclear beta-catenin could regulate Wnt target genes. Following the discovery, a model was established whereby Wnt signalling-regulated beta-catenin in the nucleus attaches to TCF/LEF DNA binding proteins, which recognise the DNA consensus sequence around the core 'CTTTG', called Wnt Response Element (WRE).

This rule that beta-catenin-TCF interaction on DNA regulates Wnt target gene expression, has nonetheless been broken by examples of Wnt- and beta-catenin-independent functions for TCF/LEF proteins (for instance in zebrafish CNS development) and functional association of Wnt-regulated beta-catenin with other DNA-binding transcription factors such as SOX, FOXO, TBX. Then again, this beta-catenin-TCF interaction on DNA is now revealed as but the core of much larger protein complexes regulating transcription, called the Wnt enhanceosomes. Conversely, additional mechanisms regulating TCF/LEF protein function have been discovered, such as phosphorylation and sumoylation.

== Structure ==
The structure and function of TCF/LEF proteins explains this bimodal function. TCF/LEF genes encode proteins with an elaborate structure that can however be summarised by considering four main domains:

1. N-terminal domain: mediating interaction with beta-catenin, which is highly conserved and mediates the transcriptional activator function.
2. Control region: includes sequences regulating and mediating the transcriptional repressor function and encoding a transcriptional repressor binding domain for the Groucho family.
3. DNA-binding domain: includes a very highly conserved HMG (High Mobility Group) DNA-binding domain and the NLS (nuclear localisation sequence).
4. C-terminal tail: may contain an additional DNA-binding domain and an additional transcriptional repressor binding domain.

Diversity in TCF/LEF protein structure and function comes from having different genes. Humans and jawed vertebrates generally have four genes encoding TCF/LEF proteins:

- TCF7 (also called TCF1)
- LEF1 (also called TCF1α)
- TCF7L1 (also called TCF3)
- TCF7L2 (also called TCF4)

Further diversity comes from expression from the same gene of alternative transcripts encoding different protein isoforms, particularly from the TCF7 and TCF7L2 genes:

- There are isoforms expressed from secondary promoters that encode proteins that lack the usual N-terminus and therefore specifically the beta-catenin binding domain (see above). These protein isoforms function not as bimodal transcription factors but as constitutive repressors, and they are refractory to upstream Wnt signalling regulation.
- There are isoforms from alternative splicing in the part of the transcript encoding the control region, which influence the propensity of the encoded protein isoforms to act as transcriptional repressors (without beta-catenin) or transcriptional activators (with beta-catenin).
- There are isoforms from alternative splicing in the part of the transcript encoding the C-terminal tail resulting in protein isoforms with and without the additional DNA-binding domain and resulting in changing the reading frame in which the last exon is translated with or without an additional transcriptional co-repressor binding domain.

== Function ==
TCF/LEF proteins function as bimodal transcription factors:

- As described, TCF/LEF proteins act as transcriptional activators in association with nuclear beta-catenin (and transcriptional co-activators attached to beta-catenin);
- but without beta-catenin, TCF/LEF proteins function as transcriptional repressors (attached to transcriptional co-repressors members of the Groucho family).

Thus, as a consequence, Wnt target genes are actively repressed in the absence of Wnt signalling activity, then activated when Wnt signalling actively drives beta-catenin into the nucleus.

TCF/LEF genes support diverse functions in embryonic development, stem cell biology, and in disease. Given the conservation of structure, functions of different TCF/LEF genes and proteins are often redundant in many organs and tissues where Wnt signalling is important, yet genetic analysis suggested from the beginning that this redundancy is only partial, suggesting TCF/LEF gene- and TCF isoform-specific functions, many of which are only now beginning to be discovered.

Prominent functions of TCF/LEF genes in embryonic development include vertebrate dorsal axis induction, anterior-posterior patterning of the developing Central Nervous System, neural crest development and many functions in organ development. Prominent functions of TCF/LEF genes in stem cell development have been particularly well dissected during the hair follicle cycle. TCF/LEF genes have roles in many cancers, with their role in colorectal cancer possibly being the best understood. However, other human diseases have also been linked to TCF/LEF genes, particularly type 2 diabetes.
