= Lethal dwarfism in rabbits =

In the rabbit (Oryctolagus cuniculus), lethal dwarfism occurs in individuals homozygous for the dwarf allele (dwdw). Homozygosity for the dwarf allele results in a lethal autosomal recessive mutation. The condition is caused by a loss-of-function mutation in the high mobility AT-hook 2 (HMGA2) gene, involving a 12.1 kb deletion spanning base pairs 44,709,089 to 44,721,236. This deletion removes the gene promoter and multiple exons, rendering the gene nonfunctional.

The mutation profoundly disrupts embryonic growth, leading to severe size reduction and altered craniofacial development. Homozygous kits are viable in utero but typically die within days of birth. In contrast, rabbits heterozygous for the dwarf allele are healthy and viable, though smaller than individuals homozygous for the wild type allele.

== Dwarf rabbits ==
Domestication of rabbits is thought to have originated in Catholic monasteries in southern France between approximately 500 and 600 AD.

The subspecies present in the region included Oryctolagus cuniculus cuniculus and O. c. algirus, native to the Iberian Peninsula, as well as populations native to France. Early domestication focused primarily on meat production, favouring larger-bodied rabbits.

The selective breeding of rabbits as companion animals occurred much later, during which smaller body size became a desirable trait. As rabbit keeping expanded beyond agricultural use, intentional breeding for reduced size increased.

Today, dwarf rabbits are widely kept as companion animals. Nine dwarf breeds are currently recognised by the American Rabbit Breeders Association (ARBA), with additional breeds recognised in other countries. While these breeds vary considerably in appearance and temperament, they all share the presence of the dwarf allele. Small-bodied non-dwarf breeds may reach similar adult weights but do not carry the dwarf allele and therefore do not produce homozygous dwdw offspring.

Dwarf rabbits exhibit characteristic morphological features, including disproportionately large, rounded heads, short snouts and relatively short, thick ears in relation to body size. These proportions distinguish dwarf rabbits from similarly sized non-dwarf breeds.

== Dwarf allele ==
The small body size of dwarf rabbits results from the combined effects of the dwarf allele (dw) and sustained selective breeding for reduced size. Rabbits homozygous for the wild-type allele (Dw/Dw) are larger than their dwarf littermates but remain smaller than standard-sized rabbits due to long-term selective pressure.

Individuals heterozygous for the dwarf allele (Dw/dw) represent the typical dwarf phenotype and are most commonly exhibited in breed standards, as they more readily meet weight requirements for competitions. These rabbits are approximately two-thirds the size of their homozygous wild-type littermates. Although the dwarf allele contributes substantially to reduced size, it is also a lethal autosomal recessive mutation.

Kits homozygous for the dwarf allele (dwdw) are colloquially known as “peanuts”. These kits are viable until birth but die within days postpartum. They are markedly smaller than healthy littermates—approximately one-third of normal size—and frequently display craniofacial abnormalities, including enlarged heads and abnormally small ears. Incomplete calcification of the skull has also been reported, leading to deformity of their skulls.

Peanuts exhibit severely impaired growth rates and, although some may briefly nurse, they rapidly fall behind in development compared with healthy siblings. If both parents are heterozygous for the dwarf allele, there is a 25% probability of producing a homozygous dwdw kit. Multiple organ systems may be affected, including the endocrine system, with reported impairment of pituitary function potentially contributing to growth failure.

The dwarf allele has been shown to be genetically linked to the Agouti gene and localised to chromosome 4, a finding confirmed through heterozygosity mapping.

== Genetic basis ==
The causal mutation underlying the dwarf allele is a 12.1 kb deletion within the HMGA2 gene (also known as HMGI-C). This deletion removes the promoter region and the first three exons, effectively knocking out gene function.

HMGA2 encodes high mobility AT-hook 2 (HMGA2), an architectural transcription factor that facilitates interactions between DNA and regulatory proteins and contributes to higher-order chromatin organisation. The gene belongs to a family of non-histone chromatin proteins and plays an important role in transcriptional regulation.

Variation in HMGA2 has been associated with body size across multiple species, including humans, mice, dogs and horses, as well as beak size variation in Darwin's finches.

In rabbits, HMGA2 is involved in embryonic growth regulation and has been linked to mitochondrial function. It is also required for normal expression of IGF2BP2, an RNA-binding protein involved in post-transcriptional regulation of multiple genes.
