= HMGB2 =

Protein-coding gene in the species Homo sapiens

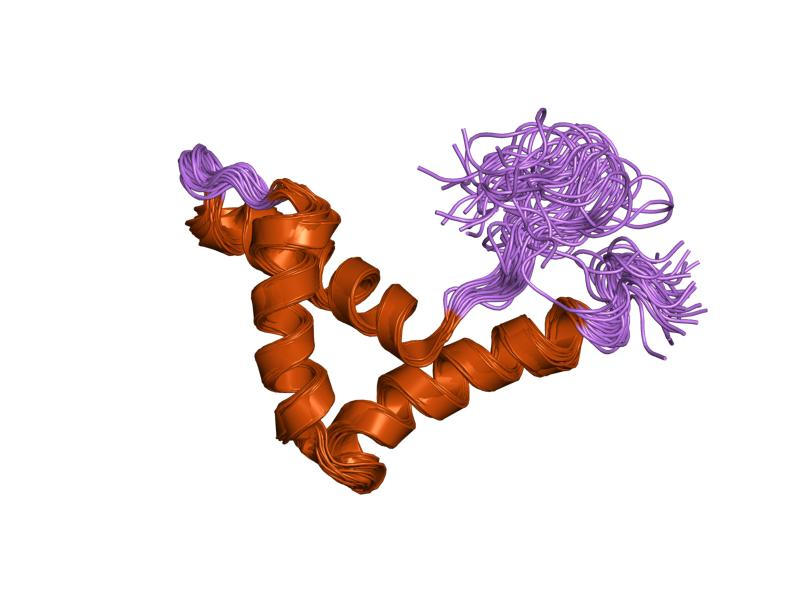

Identifiers
- Aliases: HMGB2, HMG2, high mobility group box 2
- External IDs: OMIM: 163906; MGI: 96157; GeneCards: HMGB2

Gene location (Human)
Chr.	Chromosome 4 (human)
Band	4q34.1	Start	173,331,376 bp
Band	4q34.1	End	173,334,432 bp

Gene location (Mouse)
Chr.	Chromosome 8 (mouse)
Band	8 B2|8 29.9 cM	Start	57,964,941 bp
Band	8 B2|8 29.9 cM	End	57,969,033 bp
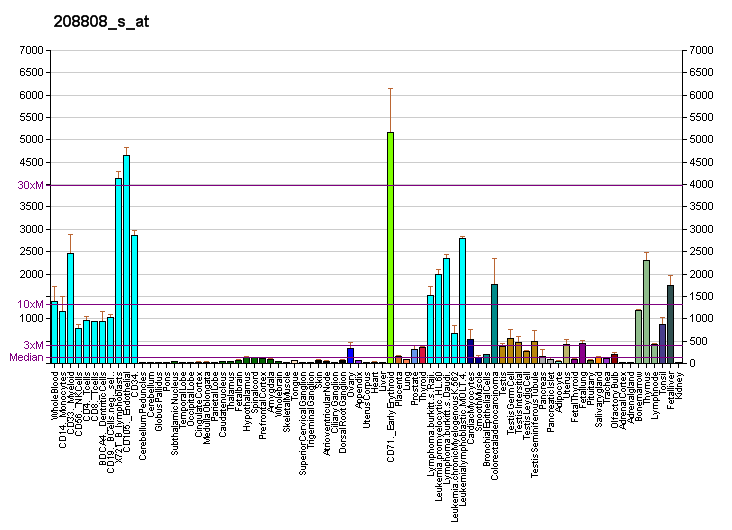
RNA expression pattern
Bgee	Human / Mouse (ortholog); Top expressed in: ventricular zone; secondary oocyte; amniotic fluid; embryo; trabecular bone; ganglionic eminence; bone marrow; tibia; thymus; germinal epithelium / Top expressed in: tail of embryo; genital tubercle; ventricular zone; granulocyte; yolk sac; zygote; embryo; blastocyst; embryo; morula; More reference expression data
BioGPS	More reference expression data
Gene ontology
Molecular function	DNA binding; protein domain specific binding; DNA-binding transcription factor activity; transcription factor binding; non-sequence-specific DNA binding, bending; single-stranded DNA binding; damaged DNA binding; protein binding; four-way junction DNA binding; cis-regulatory region sequence-specific DNA binding; RAGE receptor binding; chemoattractant activity; double-stranded DNA binding; DNA binding, bending; supercoiled DNA binding; RNA binding; transcription coactivator activity
Cellular component	cytoplasm; nucleoplasm; chromosome; extracellular region; nucleolus; perinuclear region of cytoplasm; condensed chromosome; nucleus; extracellular space; protein-containing complex
Biological process	DNA geometric change; positive regulation of interferon-beta production; nucleosome assembly; DNA recombination; apoptotic DNA fragmentation; male gonad development; regulation of transcription, DNA-templated; positive regulation of endothelial cell proliferation; positive regulation of erythrocyte differentiation; inflammatory response to antigenic stimulus; immune system process; regulation of transcription by RNA polymerase II; response to steroid hormone; chromatin organization; negative regulation of gene expression; transcription, DNA-templated; positive regulation of transcription, DNA-templated; chemotaxis; response to lipopolysaccharide; positive regulation of gene expression; positive regulation of nuclease activity; defense response to Gram-negative bacterium; negative regulation of extrinsic apoptotic signaling pathway via death domain receptors; V(D)J recombination; spermatogenesis; positive regulation of innate immune response; cell chemotaxis; DNA ligation involved in DNA repair; spermatid nucleus differentiation; positive regulation of DNA binding; innate immune response; negative regulation of transcription, DNA-templated; cellular response to lipopolysaccharide; inflammatory response; positive regulation of megakaryocyte differentiation; regulation of neurogenesis; regulation of stem cell proliferation; DNA topological change; positive regulation of transcription by RNA polymerase II; defense response to Gram-positive bacterium; positive chemotaxis; chromatin remodeling
Sources:Amigo / QuickGO
Orthologs
Databases	NCBI: entry; OMA: entry
Species	Human	Mouse
Entrez	3148	97165
Ensembl	ENSG00000164104	ENSMUSG00000054717
UniProt	P26583	P30681
RefSeq (mRNA)	NM_002129; NM_001130688; NM_001130689	NM_008252; NM_001363443; NM_001363444; NM_001363445
RefSeq (protein)	NP_001124160; NP_001124161; NP_002120	NP_032278; NP_001350372; NP_001350373; NP_001350374
Location (UCSC)	Chr 4: 173.33 – 173.33 Mb	Chr 8: 57.96 – 57.97 Mb
PubMed search
- Wikidata
View/Edit Human	View/Edit Mouse

High-mobility group protein B2 also known as high-mobility group protein 2 (HMG-2) is a protein that in humans is encoded by the HMGB2 gene.

== Function ==
This gene encodes a member of the non-histone chromosomal high-mobility group protein family. The proteins of this family are chromatin-associated and ubiquitously distributed in the nucleus of higher eukaryotic cells. In vitro studies have demonstrated that this protein is able to efficiently bend DNA and form DNA circles. These studies suggest a role in facilitating cooperative interactions between cis-acting proteins by promoting DNA flexibility. This protein was also reported to be involved in the final ligation step in DNA end-joining processes of DNA double-strand breaks repair and V(D)J recombination.
