= HMGB4 =

Protein-coding gene in humans

Identifiers
- Aliases: HMGB4, dJ1007G16.5, high mobility group box 4
- External IDs: OMIM: 617285; MGI: 1916567; GeneCards: HMGB4

Gene location (Human)
Chr.	Chromosome 1 (human)
Band	1p35.1	Start	33,860,475 bp
Band	1p35.1	End	33,864,791 bp

Gene location (Mouse)
Chr.	Chromosome 4 (mouse)
Band	4|4 D2.2	Start	128,154,005 bp
Band	4|4 D2.2	End	128,154,750 bp
RNA expression pattern
Bgee	Human / Mouse (ortholog); Top expressed in: right testis; left testis; sperm; testicle; tail of epididymis; right coronary artery; caput epididymis; ectocervix; right uterine tube; canal of the cervix / Top expressed in: seminiferous tubule; spermatid; spermatocyte; muscle tissue; central gray substance of midbrain; striated muscle tissue; pancreas; skeletal muscle tissue; islet of Langerhans; hypothalamus; More reference expression data
BioGPS	n/a
Gene ontology
Molecular function	protein binding; DNA binding; transcription factor binding; DNA binding, bending
Cellular component	nucleus; chromosome; cytoplasm
Biological process	activation of innate immune response; DNA recombination; chromatin remodeling; regulation of transcription by RNA polymerase II; regulation of signaling receptor activity; positive regulation of autophagy; developmental process; positive regulation of interleukin-6 production; positive regulation of tumor necrosis factor production; positive regulation of innate immune response; positive regulation of transcription by RNA polymerase II; cell chemotaxis; positive regulation of ERK1 and ERK2 cascade; positive regulation of NIK/NF-kappaB signaling
Sources:Amigo / QuickGO
Orthologs
Databases	NCBI: entry; OMA: entry
Species	Human	Mouse
Entrez	127540	69317
Ensembl	ENSG00000176256	ENSMUSG00000048686
UniProt	Q8WW32	Q6P8W9
RefSeq (mRNA)	NM_145205; NM_001352984; NM_001379301	NM_027036
RefSeq (protein)	NP_660206; NP_001339913; NP_001366230	NP_081312
Location (UCSC)	Chr 1: 33.86 – 33.86 Mb	Chr 4: 128.15 – 128.15 Mb
PubMed search
- Wikidata
View/Edit Human	View/Edit Mouse

High mobility group protein B4 is a transcription factor that in humans is encoded by the HMGB4 gene.

== See also ==
- High-mobility group
