= HMGN =

Group of proteins

HMGN (High-Mobility Group Nucleosome-binding) proteins are members of the broader class of high-mobility group (HMG) chromosomal proteins that are involved in regulation of transcription, replication, recombination, and DNA repair.

HMGN1 and HMGN2 (initially designated HMG-14 and HMG-17 respectively) were discovered by E.W. Johns research group in the early 1970s. HMGN3, HMGN4, and HMGN5 were discovered later and are less abundant. HMGNs are nucleosome binding proteins that help in transcription, replication, recombination, and DNA repair. They can also alter the chromatin epigenetic landscape, helping to stabilize cell identity. There is still relatively little known about their structure and function. HMGN proteins are found in all vertebrates, and play a role in chromatin structure and histone modification. HMGNs come in long chains of amino acids, containing around 100 for HMGN1-4, and roughly 200 in HMGN5. Recent research on the HMGN family is focused on their effect on cell identity, and how reduction of HMGNs relates to induced reprogramming of mouse embryonic fibroblasts (MEFs).

== Function ==
Much of the research that has been done HMGN proteins have been done in vitro, while there is relatively little on the in vivo function and roles of HMGN proteins.

Due to these proteins being predominantly found in higher eukaryotes, the use of microorganisms and other lower eukaryotes has deemed insufficient to determine the in vivo roles of HMGN proteins. A study was done with knockout mice to see the effect if any that HMGN proteins play on a full organism level. This resulted in the mice showing increasing sensitivity to UV radiation when having less than normal levels of HMGN(2). This would indicate that HMGN might facilitate repair of UV damage. The same increase in sensitivity was observed in mice when exposed to gamma radiation, however the cellular processes that repair DNA in either case are drastically different, leading to an inconclusive state whether HMGN proteins facilitate DNA repair in vivo.

HMGN1 and HMGN2 do not co-localize within living cells. This is indication of possible different roles of each HMGN.

== Family ==
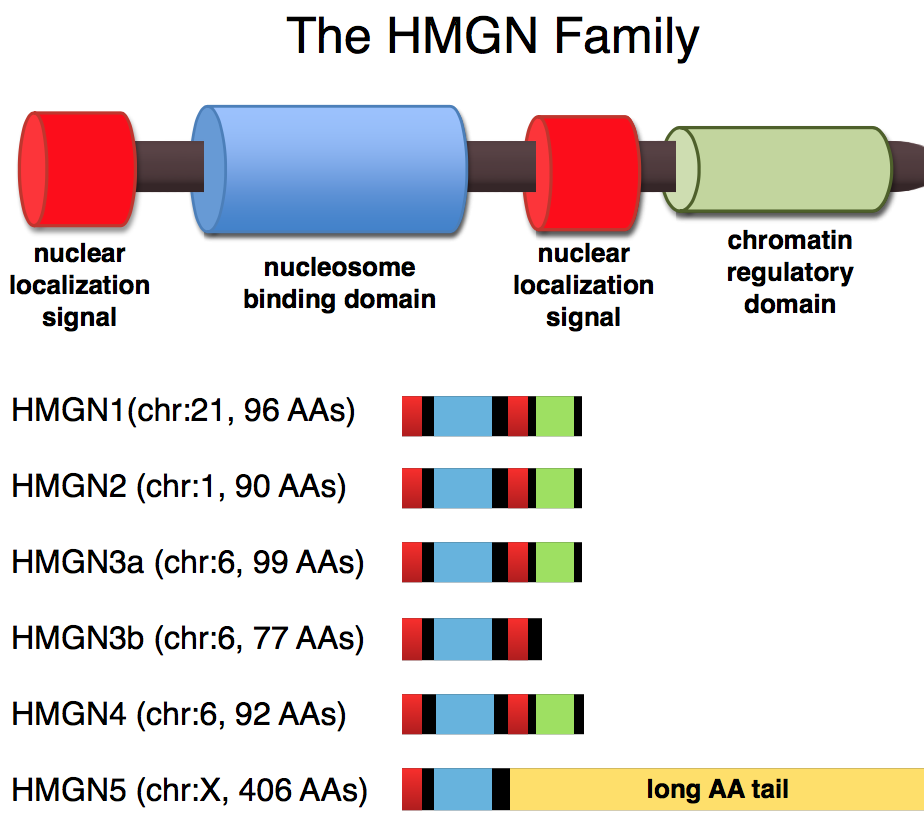
HMGN Family of proteins. AAs are amino acids in length. Inspired by a figure from Developmental function of HMGN Proteins by Takashi Furusawa and Srujana Cherukuri

HMGN proteins are part of broader group of proteins referred to as High Mobility group chromosomal (HMG) proteins. This larger group was named this for their high electrophoretic mobility in polyacrylamide gels and is differentiated into 3 distinct but related groups, one of them being HMGN proteins. HMGN family can be further divided into specific proteins, these being HMGN1, HMGN2, HMGN3, HMGN4, and HMGN5. The overall sizes of the proteins vary to each specific one, but HMGN1-4 average 100 amino acids. Whereas the larger HMGN5 proteins are 300+ amino acids long in mice and roughly 200 in length for humans.

=== HMGN 1 and HMGN 2 ===
HMGN1 and HMGN2 are among the most common of the HMGN proteins. The main purpose and function are reducing the compaction of the cellular chromatin by nucleosome binding. NMR evidence shows that reducing compaction occurs when the proteins targets the main elements that are responsible for the compactions of the chromatin. These have an expression rates that correlate to the differentiation of the cells it is present in. Areas that have experienced differentiation have reduced expression levels in comparison to undifferentiated areas, where HMGN1 and HMGN2 are highly expressed.

The proteins bind to the inner side of the nucleosomal DNA, altering the interaction between the DNA and the histone octamer. It is thought that they may be involved in the process that confers specific chromatin conformations to transcribable regions in the genome.

=== HMGN 3 ===
HMGN3 has two variants, HMGN3a and HMGN3b. Unlike the HMGN1 and HMGN2 proteins, both forms of HMGN3 tend to be tissue and development specific. They are only expressed in certain tissues at specific developmental stages. There is no preference to a certain tissue given by the two variants of the HMGN3 proteins. There is equal likelihood that either be present in a certain highly expressed HMGN3 tissue. The brain and the eyes in particular are areas that HMGN3 is heavily expressed as well as in adult pancreatic islet cells. It has been shown that the loss of HMGN3 in mice has led to a mild onset of diabetes due to ineffective insulin secretion.

=== HMGN 4 ===
The discovery of HMGN4 was done by GenBank during a database search and identified it as a "new HMGN2 like transcript", indicating that HMGN4 is closely related to HMGN2. There has been very little research done on HMGN4 proteins. The gene associated with the production of the HMGN4 is located in a region associated with schizophrenia on chromosome 6. Until this point every kind of HMGN has been identified in the vertebrates, but HMGN4 has only been seen and identified in primates. Within humans, HMGN4 has shown high levels of expression in the thyroid, thymus and the lymph nodes.

=== HMGN 5 ===
The most recent addition to the HMGN protein family is of HMGN5. It is larger than the previous HMGNs, containing 300+ amino acids, due to a long C-terminal domain that varies with species, explaining why mice and humans have a different size of HMGN5. Its biological function is unknown but has shown expression in placental development. There have also been cases where HMGN5 was present in human tumors including, prostate cancer, breast cancer, lung cancer, etc. For this reason, it is thought that HMGN5 might have some link to cancer and might be a potential target for cancer therapy in the future.

== Binding of HMGN proteins to chromatin ==
Chromatin organization By Sha, K. and Boyer, L. A., stemBook 2009

The location of HMGN during mitosis is the subject of several studies. It is very difficult to date their intra-nuclear organization during the various stages of cell cycle. There is a superfamily of abundance and ubiquitous nuclear proteins that bind to chromatin without any known DNA sequence, which is composed of HMGA, HMBG, and HMGN families. HMGA is associated with chromatin throughout the cell cycle, located in the scaffold of the metaphase chromosome. Both HMGB and HMGN are associated with the mitotic chromosome. The interactions of all HMGs with chromatin is highly dynamic, proteins move constantly throughout the nucleus.

The sample nucleosomes for potential binding sites in a "stop and go" manner, with the "stop" step being longer than the "go" step. Through the use of immunofluorescence studies, live cell imaging, gel mobility shift assays, and bimolecular fluorescence complementation, the above was determined and also by comparing the chromatin binding properties of wild-type and HMGN mutant proteins. In conclusion, HMGNs can associate with mitotic chromatin. However, the binding of HMGN to mitotic chromatin is not dependent on a functional HMGN nucleosomal binding domain, and weaker than the binding to interphase nucleosomes in which HMGNs form specific complexes with nucleosomes.

The SMART signature describes a nucleosomal binding domain, which facilitates binding of proteins to nucleosomes in chromatin. The domain is most commonly found in the high mobility group (HMG) proteins, HMGN1 and HMGN2, however, it is also found in other proteins which bind to nucleosomes, e.g. Hmgn5. Hmgn5 is a nucleosomal binding protein, first identified in mice, which is related to HMGN1 and HMGN2. Hmgn5 binds specifically to nucleosome core particles, and can function as a transcriptional activator. These findings led to the suggestion that this domain, common to Hmgn5, HMGN1 and HMGN2 is responsible for binding of the proteins to nucleosomes in chromatin.

== H1 competition and chromatin remodeling ==
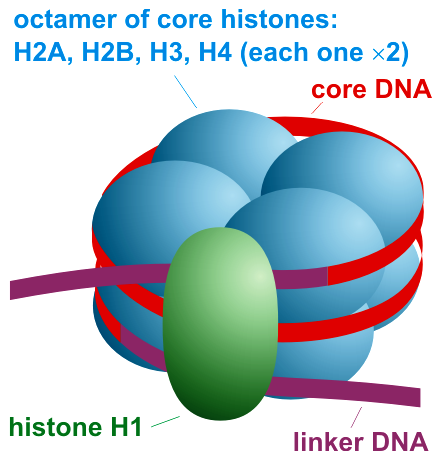
Diagram of nucleosome with bound histone H1

Nucleosomes serve as the protein core (made from 8 histones) for DNA to wrap around, functioning as a foundation for the larger and more condensed chromatin structures of chromosomes. HMGN proteins compete with Histone H1 (linker histone not part of the core nucleosome) for nucleosome binding sites. Once occupied one protein cannot displace the other. However both proteins are not permanently associated to the nucleosomes and can be removed via post transcriptional modifications. In the case of HMGN proteins, Protein kinase C (PKC) can phosphorylate the serine amino acids in the nucleosome binding domain present in all HMGN variants. This gives HMGNs a mobile character as they are continuously able to bind and unbind to nucleosomes depending on the intracellular environment and signaling.

Active competition between HMGNs and H1 serve an active role in chromatin remodeling and as result play a role in the cell cycle and cellular differentiation where chromatin compaction and de-compaction determine if certain genes are expressed or not. Histone acetylation is usually associated with open chromatin, and histone methylation is usually associated with closed chromatin.

With use of ChIP-sequencing it is possible to study DNA paired with proteins to determine what kind of histone modifications are present when the nucleosomes are bound to either H1 or HMGNs. Using this method it was found that H1 presence corresponded to high levels of H3K27me3 and H3K4me3, which means that the H3 histone is heavily methylated suggesting that the chromatin structure is closed. It was also found that HMGN presence corresponded to high levels of H3K27ac and H3K4me1, conversely meaning that the H3 histone methylation is greatly reduced suggesting the chromatin structure is open.

== Transcriptional activity and cellular differentiation ==
=== Functional compensation ===
While the role of HMGNs are still being researched, it is clear that the absence of HMGNs in knock out (KO) and knock down (KD) studies result in a significant difference of a cell's total transcriptional activity. Several transcriptome studies have been conducted which show various other genes are either unregulated or down regulated due to HMGN absence.

Interestingly in the case of HMGN1&2 only knocking out HMGN1 or HMGN2 results in changes for just few genes. But when you knock out both HMGN1&2 there is far more pronounced effect with regard to changes in gene activity. For example, in mice brain when only HMGN1 was knocked out only 1 gene was up-regulated, when only HMGN2 was knocked out 19 genes were up-regulated and 29 down-regulated. But when both HMGN1&2 are knocked out 50 genes were up-regulated and 41 down-regulated. If you simply tallied the totals for the HMGN1 and HMGN2 knock outs you would not get the same results as an HMGN1&2 DKO (double knock out).

This is described as functional compensation since both HMGN1 and HMGN2 are only slightly different in terms of protein structure and essentially do the same thing. They have largely the same affinity for nucleosomal binding sites. That means a lot of times if HMGN1 is absent, HMGN2 can fill in and vis versa. Using ChIP-seq it was found in mice chromosomes there were 16.5K sites were both HMGN1&2 could bind, 14.6K sites that had HMGN1 preference and only 6.4K sites that had HMGN2 preference. Differences in HMGN1 and HMGN2 activity are pronounced in the brain, thymus, liver, and spleen suggesting HMGN variants also have specialized roles in addition to their overlapping functionality.

=== Eye development ===
This overlapping functionality may seem redundant or even deleterious, however these proteins are integral to various cellular processes, especially differentiation and embryogenesis as it provides a means for dynamic chromatin modeling. For example, in mice embryo, during ocular development HMGN1,2&3. HMGN1 expression is elevated during initial stages of eye development in progenitor cells, but is decreased in newly formed and fated cells, such as lens fiber cells. HMGN2 in contrast stays elevated in both embryonic and adult eye cells. HMGN3 was found to be especially elevated at 2 weeks (for an adult mouse) in the inner nuclear and ganglion cells. This shows there is an uneven distribution of HMGNs in pre-fated and adult cells.

=== Brain / CNS development ===
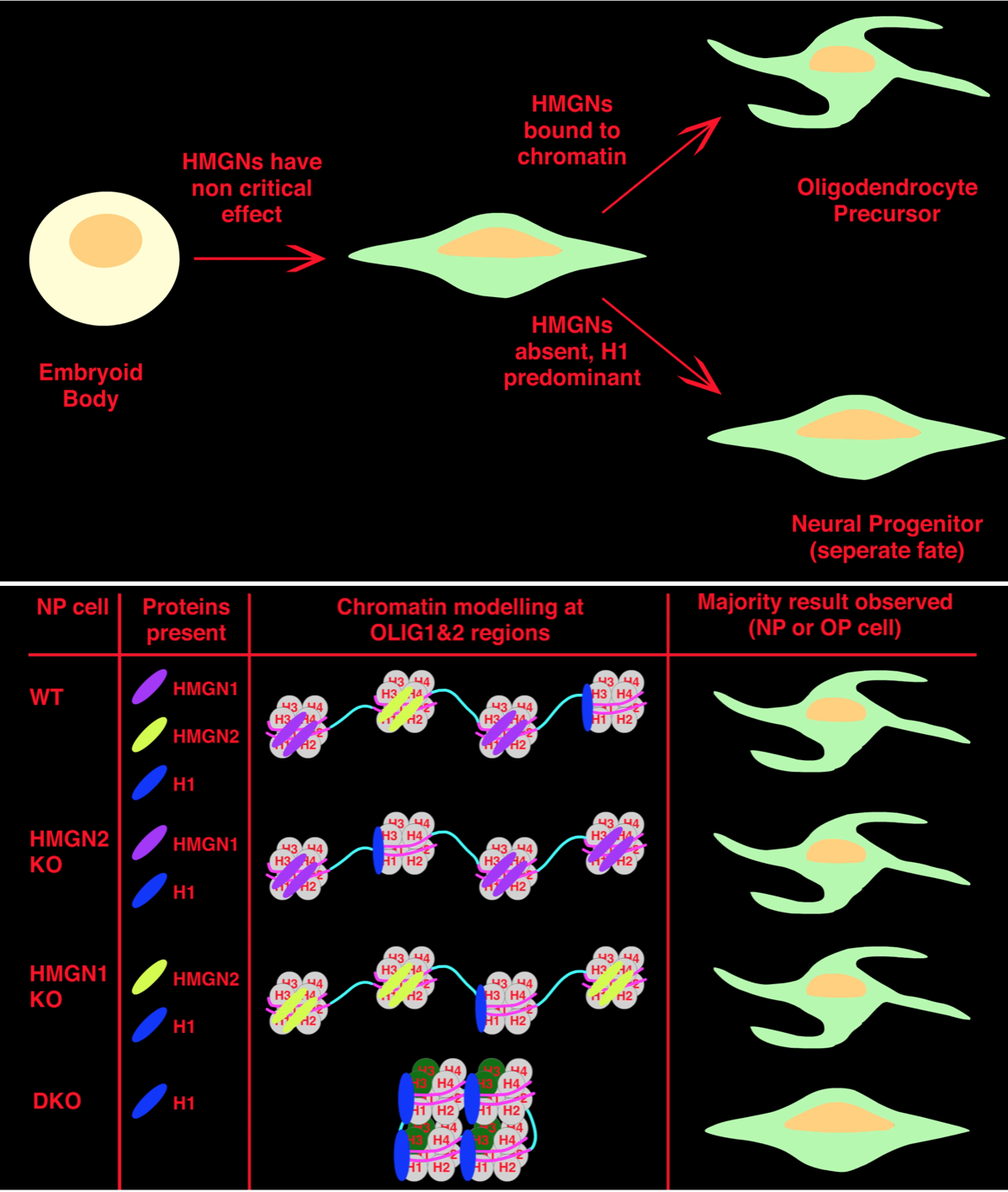
Oligodendrocyte differentiation is HMGN reliant

In human brain development HMGNs have been shown to be a critical component of neural differentiation and are elevated in neural stem cells (neural progenitor cells). For example, in a knock down study, loss of HMGN1,2&3 resulted in lower population of astrocyte cells and higher population of neural progenitor cells.

In oligodendrocyte differentiation HMGNs are critical, since when HMGN1&2 are both knocked out the population of oligodendrocytes in spinal tissue was reduced 65%. However, due to functional compensation this effect is not observed when only HMGN1 or HMGN2 are knocked. This observation if not just correlation. With ChIP-seq analysis it is shown that chromatin modeling at the OLIG1&2 genes (transcription factors involved in oligodendrocyte differentiation) is in an open conformation and has HMGNs bound to the nucleosomes.

It can be inferred that this redundancy is actually beneficial as the presence of at least one HMGN variant vastly improves tissue differentiation and development. These findings are summarized in the figure to the right.

== See also ==
- High-mobility group
