= HMGN4 =

Protein-coding gene in the species Homo sapiens

Identifiers
- Aliases: HMGN4, HMG17L3, NHC, high mobility group nucleosomal binding domain 4
- External IDs: GeneCards: HMGN4

Gene location (Human)
Chr.	Chromosome 6 (human)
Band	6p22.2	Start	26,538,366 bp
Band	6p22.2	End	26,546,933 bp
RNA expression pattern
Bgee	Human / Mouse (ortholog); Top expressed in: secondary oocyte; germinal epithelium; Epithelium of choroid plexus; epithelium of nasopharynx; parietal pleura; endothelial cell; granulocyte; superficial temporal artery; endometrium; smooth muscle tissue / n/a; More reference expression data
BioGPS	n/a
Orthologs
Databases	NCBI: entry; OMA: entry
Species	Human	Mouse
Entrez	10473	n/a
Ensembl	ENSG00000182952	n/a
UniProt	O00479	n/a
RefSeq (mRNA)	NM_006353	n/a
RefSeq (protein)	NP_006344; NP_006344.1	n/a
Location (UCSC)	Chr 6: 26.54 – 26.55 Mb	n/a
PubMed search		n/a
- Wikidata
View/Edit Human

High mobility group nucleosome-binding domain-containing protein 4 is a transcription factor that in humans is encoded by the HMGN4 gene.

== Function ==
The protein encoded by this gene, a member of the HMGN protein family, is thought to reduce the compactness of the chromatin fiber in nucleosomes, thereby enhancing transcription from chromatin templates. Transcript variants utilizing alternative polyadenylation signals exist for this gene.

== See also ==
- High-mobility group
