= LHFPL2 =

Protein-coding gene in the species Homo sapiens

Identifiers
- Aliases: LHFPL2, lipoma HMGIC fusion partner-like 2, LHFPL tetraspan subfamily member 2
- External IDs: OMIM: 609718; MGI: 2145236; GeneCards: LHFPL2

Gene location (Human)
Chr.	Chromosome 5 (human)
Band	5q14.1	Start	78,485,215 bp
Band	5q14.1	End	78,770,021 bp

Gene location (Mouse)
Chr.	Chromosome 13 (mouse)
Band	13|13 C3	Start	94,194,304 bp
Band	13|13 C3	End	94,331,917 bp
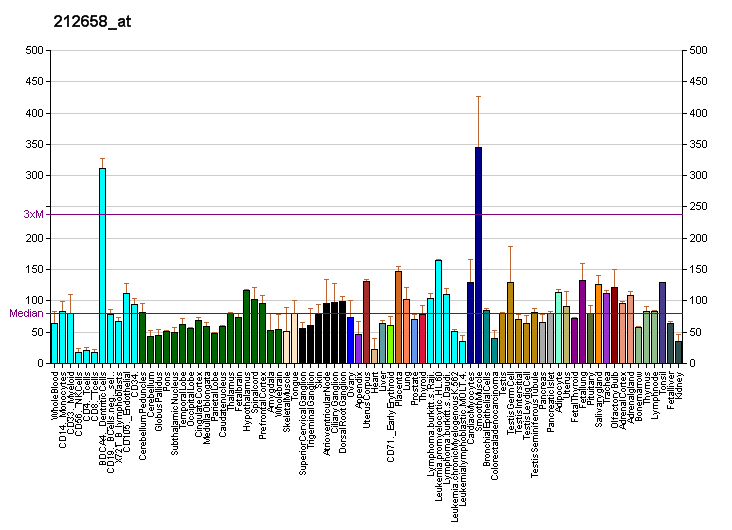
RNA expression pattern
Bgee	Human / Mouse (ortholog); Top expressed in: vena cava; Achilles tendon; synovial membrane; synovial joint; cartilage tissue; olfactory bulb; saphenous vein; tendon of biceps brachii; pericardium; duodenum / Top expressed in: medullary collecting duct; epithelium of lens; otolith organ; utricle; retinal pigment epithelium; cumulus cell; efferent ductule; ciliary body; iris; decidua; More reference expression data
BioGPS	More reference expression data
Gene ontology
Molecular function	molecular function
Cellular component	membrane; integral component of membrane; plasma membrane; platelet alpha granule membrane; cellular component
Biological process	platelet degranulation; development of primary female sexual characteristics; development of primary male sexual characteristics; positive regulation of fertilization; single fertilization; biological process
Sources:Amigo / QuickGO
Orthologs
Databases	NCBI: entry; OMA: entry
Species	Human	Mouse
Entrez	10184	218454
Ensembl	ENSG00000145685	ENSMUSG00000045312
UniProt	Q6ZUX7	Q8BGA2
RefSeq (mRNA)	NM_005779	NM_172589
RefSeq (protein)	NP_005770	NP_766177
Location (UCSC)	Chr 5: 78.49 – 78.77 Mb	Chr 13: 94.19 – 94.33 Mb
PubMed search
- Wikidata
View/Edit Human	View/Edit Mouse

Lipoma HMGIC fusion partner-like 2 protein is a protein that in humans is encoded by the LHFPL2 gene.

This gene is a member of the lipoma HMGIC fusion partner (LHFP) gene family, which is a subset of the superfamily of tetraspan transmembrane protein encoding genes. Mutations in one LHFP-like gene result in deafness in humans and mice, and a second LHFP-like gene is fused to a high-mobility group gene in a translocation-associated lipoma. Alternatively spliced transcript variants have been found, but their biological validity has not been determined.
