= HMGN2 =

Protein-coding gene in humans

Identifiers
- Aliases: HMGN2, HMG17, high mobility group nucleosomal binding domain 2
- External IDs: OMIM: 163910; GeneCards: HMGN2

Gene location (Human)
Chr.	Chromosome 1 (human)
Band	1p36.11	Start	26,472,440 bp
Band	1p36.11	End	26,476,642 bp
RNA expression pattern
Bgee	Human / Mouse (ortholog); Top expressed in: ventricular zone; ganglionic eminence; right uterine tube; pituitary gland; anterior pituitary; bone marrow cell; left ovary; thyroid gland; endometrium; right lobe of thyroid gland / n/a; More reference expression data
BioGPS	n/a
Gene ontology
Molecular function	nucleosomal DNA binding; DNA binding; protein binding; RNA binding
Cellular component	chromatin; extracellular space; nucleus; cytoplasm
Biological process	antimicrobial humoral immune response mediated by antimicrobial peptide
Sources:Amigo / QuickGO
Orthologs
Databases	NCBI: entry; OMA: entry
Species	Human	Mouse
Entrez	3151	n/a
Ensembl	ENSG00000198830	n/a
UniProt	P05204	n/a
RefSeq (mRNA)	NM_005517	n/a
RefSeq (protein)	NP_005508	n/a
Location (UCSC)	Chr 1: 26.47 – 26.48 Mb	n/a
PubMed search		n/a
- Wikidata
View/Edit Human

Non-histone chromosomal protein HMG-17 is a protein that in humans is encoded by the HMGN2 gene.

== See also ==
- High mobility group protein HMG14 and HMG17
- HMGN1 (HMG-14)
