= TCF7L2 =

Protein-coding gene in humans

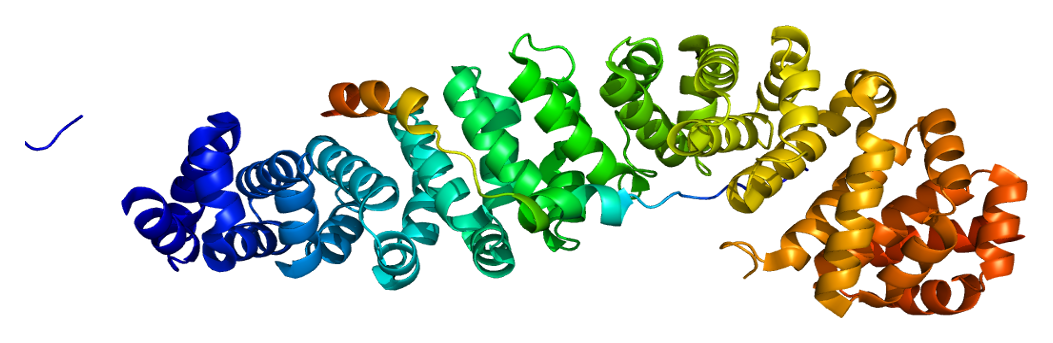

Identifiers
- Aliases: TCF7L2, TCF-4, TCF4, transcription factor 7 like 2
- External IDs: OMIM: 602228; MGI: 1202879; GeneCards: TCF7L2
Available structures
PDB	Ortholog search: PDBe RCSB
PDB	List of PDB id codes 2GL7, 1JDH, 1JPW

Gene location (Human)
Chr.	Chromosome 10 (human)
Band	10q25.2-q25.3	Start	112,950,247 bp
Band	10q25.2-q25.3	End	113,167,678 bp

Gene location (Mouse)
Chr.	Chromosome 19 (mouse)
Band	19 D2|19 51.59 cM	Start	55,730,252 bp
Band	19 D2|19 51.59 cM	End	55,922,086 bp
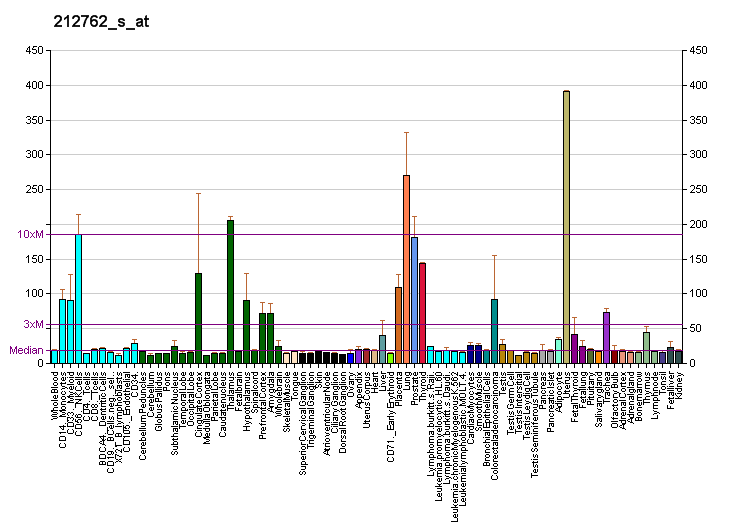

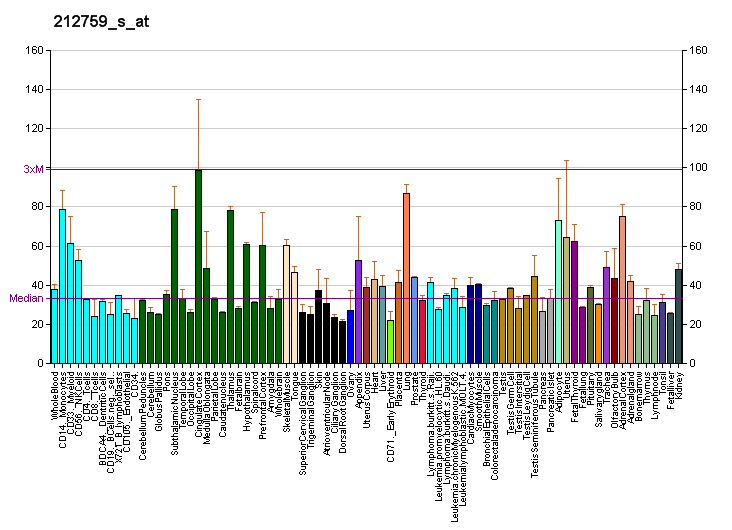

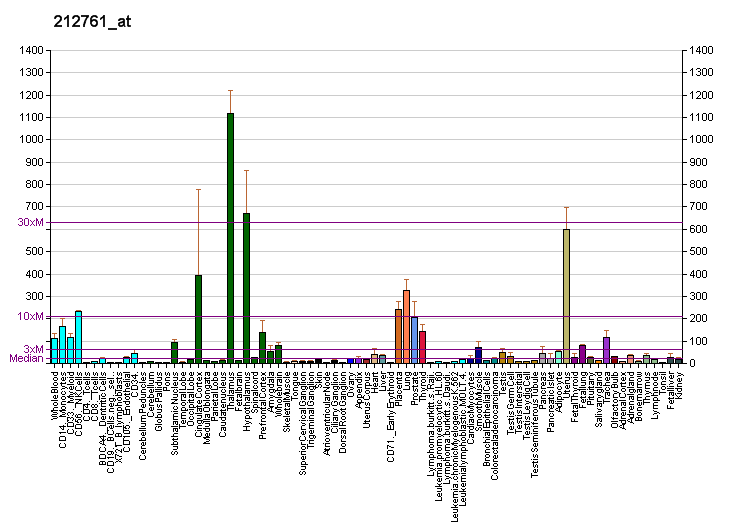
RNA expression pattern
Bgee	Human / Mouse (ortholog); Top expressed in: lateral nuclear group of thalamus; endothelial cell; pancreatic ductal cell; hair follicle; decidua; epithelium of lactiferous gland; lactiferous duct; tibia; visceral pleura; germinal epithelium / Top expressed in: medial dorsal nucleus; medial geniculate nucleus; habenula; lateral geniculate nucleus; inferior colliculi; ascending aorta; aortic valve; internal carotid artery; external carotid artery; genital tubercle; More reference expression data
BioGPS	More reference expression data
Gene ontology
Molecular function	sequence-specific DNA binding; DNA binding; beta-catenin binding; gamma-catenin binding; DNA-binding transcription factor activity; transcription factor binding; RNA polymerase II cis-regulatory region sequence-specific DNA binding; protein binding; armadillo repeat domain binding; protein kinase binding; DNA-binding transcription factor activity, RNA polymerase II-specific; chromatin binding
Cellular component	beta-catenin-TCF7L2 complex; PML body; nucleoplasm; protein-DNA complex; nucleus; transcription regulator complex
Biological process	positive regulation of heparan sulfate proteoglycan biosynthetic process; positive regulation of protein kinase B signaling; regulation of transcription, DNA-templated; glucose homeostasis; regulation of transcription by RNA polymerase II; response to glucose; Wnt signaling pathway; regulation of smooth muscle cell proliferation; negative regulation of DNA-binding transcription factor activity; canonical Wnt signaling pathway involved in positive regulation of epithelial to mesenchymal transition; transcription, DNA-templated; positive regulation of protein export from nucleus; maintenance of DNA repeat elements; blood vessel development; myoblast fate commitment; canonical Wnt signaling pathway; pancreas development; positive regulation of protein binding; regulation of hormone metabolic process; cell population proliferation; negative regulation of transcription, DNA-templated; fat cell differentiation; negative regulation of canonical Wnt signaling pathway; beta-catenin-TCF complex assembly; Wnt signaling pathway, calcium modulating pathway; positive regulation of insulin secretion; negative regulation of transcription by RNA polymerase II; positive regulation of transcription by RNA polymerase II; negative regulation of type B pancreatic cell apoptotic process; negative regulation of extrinsic apoptotic signaling pathway; positive regulation of epithelial cell proliferation
Sources:Amigo / QuickGO
Orthologs
Databases	NCBI: entry; OMA: entry
Species	Human	Mouse
Entrez	6934	21416
Ensembl	ENSG00000148737	ENSMUSG00000024985
UniProt	Q9NQB0	Q924A0
RefSeq (mRNA)	NM_001146274; NM_001146283; NM_001146284; NM_001146285; NM_001146286 NM_001198525; NM_001198526; NM_001198527; NM_001198528; NM_001198529; NM_001198530; NM_001198531; NM_030756; NM_001349870; NM_001349871; NM_001363501; NM_001367943	NM_001142918; NM_001142919; NM_001142920; NM_001142921; NM_001142922 NM_001142923; NM_001142924; NM_009333; NM_001331135; NM_001331136; NM_001331137; NM_001331138; NM_001331139; NM_001331140; NM_001331141; NM_001331142; NM_001331143; NM_001331144; NM_001331145; NM_001331146; NM_001331147; NM_001331148; NM_001331149; NM_001331150
RefSeq (protein)	NP_001139746; NP_001139755; NP_001139756; NP_001139757; NP_001139758 NP_001185454; NP_001185455; NP_001185456; NP_001185457; NP_001185458; NP_001185459; NP_001185460; NP_110383; NP_001336799; NP_001336800; NP_001350430; NP_001354872; NP_001139757.1	NP_001136390; NP_001136391; NP_001136392; NP_001136393; NP_001136394 NP_001136395; NP_001136396; NP_001318064; NP_001318065; NP_001318066; NP_001318067; NP_001318068; NP_001318069; NP_001318070; NP_001318071; NP_001318072; NP_001318073; NP_001318074; NP_001318075; NP_001318076; NP_001318077; NP_001318078; NP_001318079; NP_033359
Location (UCSC)	Chr 10: 112.95 – 113.17 Mb	Chr 19: 55.73 – 55.92 Mb
PubMed search
- Wikidata
View/Edit Human	View/Edit Mouse

Transcription factor 7-like 2 (T-cell specific, HMG-box), also known as TCF7L2 or TCF4, is a protein acting as a transcription factor that, in humans, is encoded by the TCF7L2 gene. The TCF7L2 gene is located on chromosome 10q25.2–q25.3, contains 19 exons. As a member of the TCF family, TCF7L2 can form a bipartite transcription factor and influence several biological pathways, including the Wnt signalling pathway.

Single-nucleotide polymorphisms (SNPs) in this gene are especially known to be linked to higher risk to develop type 2 diabetes, gestational diabetes, multiple neurodevelopmental disorders including schizophrenia and autism spectrum disorder, as well as other diseases. The SNP rs7903146, within the TCF7L2 gene, is, to date, the most significant genetic marker associated with type 2 diabetes risk.

Structure of complex between TCF7L2 (orange), β-catenin (red), and BCL9 (brown)

== Function ==
TCF7L2 is a transcription factor influencing the transcription of several genes thereby exerting a large variety of functions within the cell. It is a member of the TCF family that can form a bipartite transcription factor (β-catenin/TCF) alongside β-catenin. Bipartite transcription factors can have large effects on the Wnt signalling pathway. Stimulation of the Wnt signaling pathway leads to the association of β-catenin with BCL9, translocation to the nucleus, and association with TCF7L2, which in turn results in the activation of Wnt target genes. The activation of the Wnt target genes specifically represses proglucagon synthesis in enteroendocrine cells. The repression of TCF7L2 using HMG-box repressor (HBP1) inhibits Wnt signalling. Therefore, TCF7L2 is an effector in the Wnt signalling pathway. TCF7L2's role in glucose metabolism is expressed in many tissues such as gut, brain, liver, and skeletal muscle. However, TCF7L2 does not directly regulate glucose metabolism in β-cells, but regulates glucose metabolism in pancreatic and liver tissues. That said, TCF7L2 directly regulates the expression of multiple transcription factors, axon guidance cues, cell adhesion molecules and ion channels in the thalamus.

The TCF7L2 gene encoding the TCF7L2 transcription factor, exhibits multiple functions through its polymorphisms and thus, is known as a pleiotropic gene. Type 2 diabetes T2DM susceptibility is exhibited in carriers of TCF7L2 rs7903146C>T and rs290481T>C polymorphisms. TCF7L2 rs290481T>C polymorphism, however, has shown no significant correlation to the susceptibility to gestational diabetes mellitus (GDM) in a Chinese Han population, whereas the T alleles of rs7903146 and rs1799884 increase susceptibility to GDM in the Chinese Han population. The difference in effects of the different polymorphisms of the gene indicate that the gene is indeed pleiotropic.

== Structure ==
The TCF7L2 gene, encoding the TCF7L2 protein, is located on chromosome 10q25.2-q25.3. The gene contains 19 exons. Of the 19 exons, 5 are alternative. The TCF7L2 protein contains 619 amino acids and its molecular mass is 67919 Da. TCF7L2's secondary structure is a helix-turn-helix structure.

== Tissue distribution ==
TCF7L2 is primarily expressed in brain (mainly in the diencephalon, including especially high in the thalamus), liver, intestine and fat cells. It does not primarily operate in the β-cells in the pancreas.

== Clinical significance ==
=== Type 2 Diabetes ===
Several single nucleotide polymorphisms within the TCF7L2 gene have been associated with type 2 diabetes. Studies conducted by Ravindranath Duggirala and Michael Stern at The University of Texas Health Science Center at San Antonio were the first to identify strong linkage for type 2 diabetes at a region on Chromosome 10 in Mexican Americans This signal was later refined by Struan Grant and colleagues at DeCODE genetics and isolated to the TCF7L2 gene. The molecular and physiological mechanisms underlying the association of TCF7L2 with type 2 diabetes are under active investigation, but it is likely that TCF7L2 has important biological roles in multiple metabolic tissues, including the pancreas, liver and adipose tissue. TCF7L2 polymorphisms can increase susceptibility to type 2 diabetes by decreasing the production of glucagon-like peptide-1 (GLP-1).

=== Gestational Diabetes (GDM) ===
TCF7L2 modulates pancreatic islet β-cell function strongly implicating its significant association with GDM risk. T alleles of rs7903146 and rs1799884 TCF7L2 polymorphisms increase susceptibility to GDM in the Chinese Han population.

=== Cancer ===
TCF7L2 plays a role in colorectal cancer. A frameshift mutation of TCF7L2 provided evidence that TCF7L2 is implicated in colorectal cancer. The silencing of TCF7L2 in KM12 colorectal cancer cells provided evidence that TCF7L2 played a role in proliferation and metastasis of cancer cells in colorectal cancer.

Variants of the gene are most likely involved in many other cancer types. TCF7L2 is indirectly involved in prostate cancer through its role in activating the PI3K/Akt pathway, a pathway involved in prostate cancer.

=== Neurodevelopmental disorders ===
Single nucleotide polymorphisms (SNPs) in TCF7L2 gene have shown an increase in susceptibility to schizophrenia in Arab, European and Chinese Han populations. In the Chinese Han population, SNP rs12573128 in TCF7L2 is the variant that was associated with an increase in schizophrenia risk. This marker is used as a pre-diagnostic marker for schizophrenia. TCF7L2 has also been reported as a risk gene in autism spectrum disorder and has been linked to it in recent large-scale genetic studies.

The mechanism behind TCF7L2's involvement in the emergence of neurodevelopmental disorders is not fully understood, as there have been few studies characterizing its role in brain development in detail. It was shown that during embryogenesis TCF7L2 is involved in the development of fish-specific habenula asymmetry in Danio rerio, and that the dominant negative TCF7L2 isoform influences cephalic separation in the embryo by inhibiting the posteriorizing effect of the Wnt pathway. It was also shown that in Tcf7l2 knockout mice the number of proliferating cells in cortical neural progenitor cells is reduced. In contrast, no such effect was found in the midbrain.

More recently it was shown that TCF7L2 plays a crucial role in both the embryonic development and postnatal maturation of the thalamus through direct and indirect regulation of many genes previously reported to be important for both processes. In late gestation TCF7L2 regulates the expression of many thalamus-enriched transcription factors (e.g. Foxp2, Rora, Mef2a, Lef1, Prox1), axon guidance molecules (e.g. Epha1, Epha4, Ntng1, Epha8) and cell adhesion molecules (e.g. Cdh6, Cdh8, Cdhr1). Accordingly, a total knockout of Tcf7l2 in mice leads to improper growth of thalamocortical axons, changed anatomy and improper sorting of the cells in the thalamo-habenular region. In the early postnaral period TCF7L2 starts to regulate the expression of many genes necessary for the acquisition of characteristic excitability patterns in the thalamus, mainly ion channels, neurotransmitters and their receptors and synaptic vescicle proteins (e.g. Cacna1g, Kcnc2, Slc17a7, Grin2b), and an early postnatal knockout of Tcf7l2 in mouse thalamus leads to significant reduction in the number and frequency of action potentials generated by the thalamocortical neurons. The mechanism that leads to the change in TCF7L2 target genes between gestation and early postnatal period is unknown. It is likely that a perinatal change in the proportion of TCF7L2 isoforms expressed in the thalamus is partially responsible. Abnormalities in the anatomy of the thalamus and the activity of its connections to the cerebral cortex are frequently detected in patients with schizophrenia and autism. Such abnormalities could arise from developmental aberrations in patients with unfavorable mutations of TCF7L2, further strengthening the link between TCF7L2 and neurodevelopmental disorders.

=== Multiple sclerosis ===
TCF7L2 is downstream of the WNT/β-catenin pathways. The activation of the WNT/β-catenin pathways have been associated demyelination in multiple sclerosis. TCF7L2 is unregulated during early remyelination, leading scientists to believe that it is involved in remyelination. TCF7L2 could act in dependence or independent of the WNT/β-catenin pathways.

== Model organisms ==
Model organisms have been used in the study of TCF7L2 function. A conditional knockout mouse line called Tcf7l2^{tm1a(EUCOMM)Wtsi} was generated at the Wellcome Trust Sanger Institute. Male and female animals underwent a standardized phenotypic screen to determine the effects of deletion. Additional screens performed: - In-depth immunological phenotyping

Variations of the protein encoding gene are found in rats, zebra fish, drosophila, and budding yeast. Therefore, all of those organisms can be used as model organisms in the study of TCF7L2 function.

== Nomenclature ==
TCF7L2 is the symbol officially approved by the HUGO Gene Nomenclature Committee for the Transcription Factor 7-Like 2 gene.

== See also ==
- TCF/LEF family
