= HMGN1 =

Protein-coding gene in the species Homo sapiens

Identifiers
- Aliases: HMGN1, HMG14, high mobility group nucleosome binding domain 1
- External IDs: OMIM: 163920; MGI: 96120; GeneCards: HMGN1

Gene location (Human)
Chr.	Chromosome 21 (human)
Band	21q22.2	Start	39,342,315 bp
Band	21q22.2	End	39,349,647 bp

Gene location (Mouse)
Chr.	Chromosome 16 (mouse)
Band	16 C4|16 56.83 cM	Start	95,921,818 bp
Band	16 C4|16 56.83 cM	End	95,928,929 bp
RNA expression pattern
Bgee	Human / Mouse (ortholog); Top expressed in: ventricular zone; ganglionic eminence; endometrium; right uterine tube; appendix; lymph node; olfactory zone of nasal mucosa; rectum; islet of Langerhans; bone marrow / Top expressed in: neural layer of retina; yolk sac; ventricular zone; embryo; embryo; genital tubercle; tail of embryo; lip; zygote; right kidney; More reference expression data
BioGPS	n/a
Gene ontology
Molecular function	nucleosomal DNA binding; DNA binding; chromatin binding
Cellular component	cytoplasm; chromatin; nucleus; nucleoplasm
Biological process	positive regulation of DNA-templated transcription, elongation; pyrimidine dimer repair by nucleotide-excision repair; transcription-coupled nucleotide-excision repair; chromatin organization; regulation of transcription by RNA polymerase II; response to UV-B; response to UV-C; regulation of development, heterochronic; post-embryonic camera-type eye morphogenesis; regulation of epithelial cell proliferation; positive regulation of NAD+ ADP-ribosyltransferase activity
Sources:Amigo / QuickGO
Orthologs
Databases	NCBI: entry; OMA: entry
Species	Human	Mouse
Entrez	3150	15312
Ensembl	ENSG00000205581	ENSMUSG00000040681
UniProt	P05114	P18608
RefSeq (mRNA)	NM_004965	NM_008251
RefSeq (protein)	NP_004956	NP_032277
Location (UCSC)	Chr 21: 39.34 – 39.35 Mb	Chr 16: 95.92 – 95.93 Mb
PubMed search
- Wikidata
View/Edit Human	View/Edit Mouse

Non-histone chromosomal protein HMG-14 is a protein that in humans is encoded by the HMGN1 gene.

== Function ==
Chromosomal protein HMG14 and its close analog HMG17 (MIM 163910) bind to the inner side of the nucleosomal DNA, potentially altering the interaction between the DNA and the histone octamer. The 2 proteins may be involved in the process that maintains transcribable genes in a unique chromatin conformation. Their ubiquitous distribution and relative abundance, as well as the high evolutionary conservation of the DNA-binding domain of the HMG14 family of proteins, suggest that they may be involved in an important cellular function.

== Interactions ==
HMGN1 has been shown to interact with YWHAZ.

== See also ==
- HMGN2
- High mobility group protein HMG14 and HMG17
