= LHFPL1 =

Protein-coding gene in the species Homo sapiens

Identifiers
- Aliases: LHFPL1, lipoma HMGIC fusion partner-like 1, lipoma HMGIC fusion partner like 1, LHFPL tetraspan subfamily member 1
- External IDs: OMIM: 300566; MGI: 1891214; GeneCards: LHFPL1

Gene location (Human)
Chr.	X chromosome (human)
Band	Xq23	Start	112,630,648 bp
Band	Xq23	End	112,680,054 bp

Gene location (Mouse)
Chr.	X chromosome (mouse)
Band	X|X F2	Start	144,073,355 bp
Band	X|X F2	End	144,132,085 bp
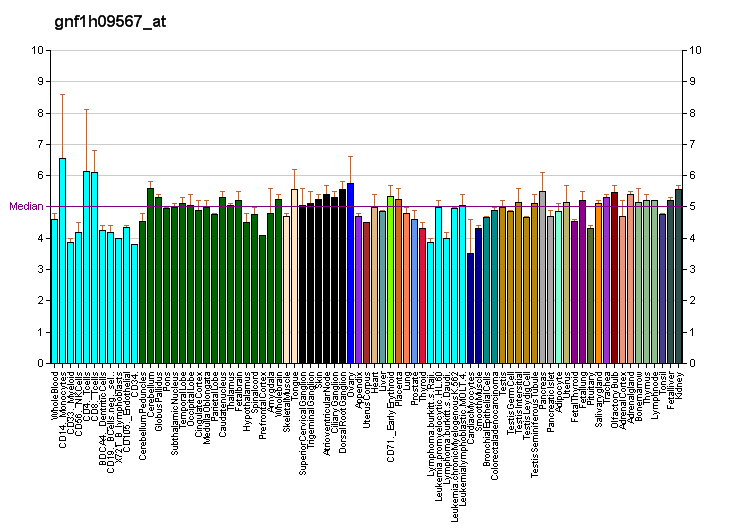
RNA expression pattern
Bgee	Human / Mouse (ortholog); Top expressed in: testicle; gonad; nucleus accumbens; left coronary artery; right coronary artery; caudate nucleus; Descending thoracic aorta; putamen; hypothalamus; substantia nigra / Top expressed in: zygote; secondary oocyte; esophagus; embryo; lip; primary oocyte; embryo; genital tubercle; zone of skin; spinal ganglia; More reference expression data
BioGPS	More reference expression data
Orthologs
Databases	NCBI: entry; OMA: entry
Species	Human	Mouse
Entrez	340596	237091
Ensembl	ENSG00000182508	ENSMUSG00000041700
UniProt	Q86WI0	Q80SV1
RefSeq (mRNA)	NM_178175	NM_178358
RefSeq (protein)	NP_835469	NP_848135
Location (UCSC)	Chr X: 112.63 – 112.68 Mb	Chr X: 144.07 – 144.13 Mb
PubMed search
- Wikidata
View/Edit Human	View/Edit Mouse

Lipoma HMGIC fusion partner-like 1 protein is a protein that in humans is encoded by the LHFPL1 gene.

This gene is a member of the lipoma HMGIC fusion partner (LHFP) gene family, which is a subset of the superfamily of tetraspan transmembrane protein encoding genes. Mutations in one LHFP-like gene result in deafness in humans and mice, and a second LHFP-like gene is fused to a high-mobility group gene in a translocation-associated lipoma. Alternatively spliced transcript variants have been found, but their biological validity has not been determined.
