= HMGN3 =

Protein-coding gene in the species Homo sapiens

Identifiers
- Aliases: HMGN3, PNAS-25, TRIP7, PNAS-24, high mobility group nucleosomal binding domain 3
- External IDs: OMIM: 604502; MGI: 2138069; GeneCards: HMGN3

Gene location (Human)
Chr.	Chromosome 6 (human)
Band	6q14.1	Start	79,201,245 bp
Band	6q14.1	End	79,234,738 bp

Gene location (Mouse)
Chr.	Chromosome 9 (mouse)
Band	9|9 E2	Start	82,992,001 bp
Band	9|9 E2	End	83,028,738 bp
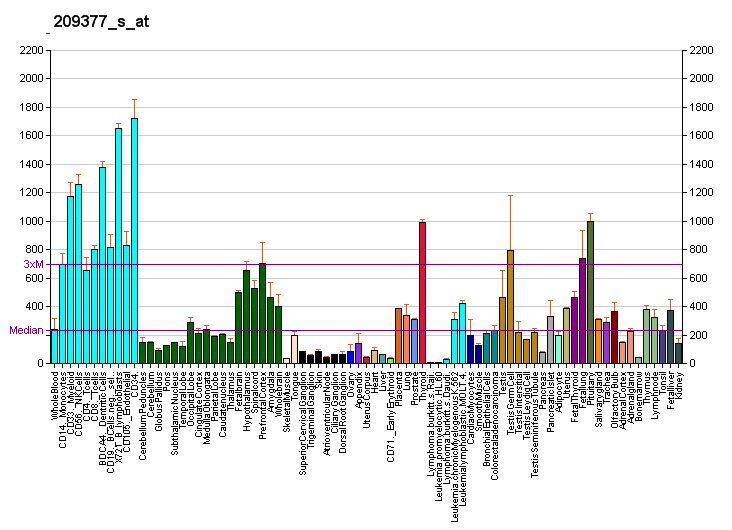
RNA expression pattern
Bgee	Human / Mouse (ortholog); Top expressed in: bronchial epithelial cell; endothelial cell; palpebral conjunctiva; right uterine tube; parietal pleura; ventricular zone; mucosa of paranasal sinus; visceral pleura; hair follicle; germinal epithelium / Top expressed in: lens; conjunctival fornix; ciliary body; epithelium of lens; saccule; islet of Langerhans; condyle; olfactory epithelium; fossa; ventricular zone; More reference expression data
BioGPS	More reference expression data
Gene ontology
Molecular function	nucleosomal DNA binding; DNA binding; chromatin binding; thyroid hormone receptor binding
Cellular component	chromatin; nucleus; nucleoplasm; cytosol
Biological process	regulation of insulin secretion involved in cellular response to glucose stimulus; positive regulation of transcription by RNA polymerase II; biological process; chromatin organization
Sources:Amigo / QuickGO
Orthologs
Databases	NCBI: entry; OMA: entry
Species	Human	Mouse
Entrez	9324	94353
Ensembl	ENSG00000118418	ENSMUSG00000066456
UniProt	Q15651	Q9DCB1
RefSeq (mRNA)	NM_001201362; NM_001201363; NM_004242; NM_138730; NM_001318884 NM_001318885; NM_001318886; NM_001318887; NM_001318888	NM_026122; NM_175074
RefSeq (protein)	NP_001188291; NP_001188292; NP_001305813; NP_001305814; NP_001305815 NP_001305816; NP_001305817; NP_004233; NP_620058	NP_080398; NP_778249
Location (UCSC)	Chr 6: 79.2 – 79.23 Mb	Chr 9: 82.99 – 83.03 Mb
PubMed search
- Wikidata
View/Edit Human	View/Edit Mouse

High mobility group nucleosome-binding domain-containing protein 3 is a protein that in humans is encoded by the HMGN3 gene.

Thyroid hormone receptors are hormone-dependent transcription factors that regulate expression of a variety of specific target genes. The protein encoded by this gene binds thyroid hormone receptor beta, but only in the presence of thyroid hormone. The encoded protein, a member of the HMGN protein family, is thought to reduce the compactness of the chromatin fiber in nucleosomes, thereby enhancing transcription from chromatin templates. Two transcript variants encoding different isoforms have been found for this gene.
