= AT-hook =

DNA-binding motif

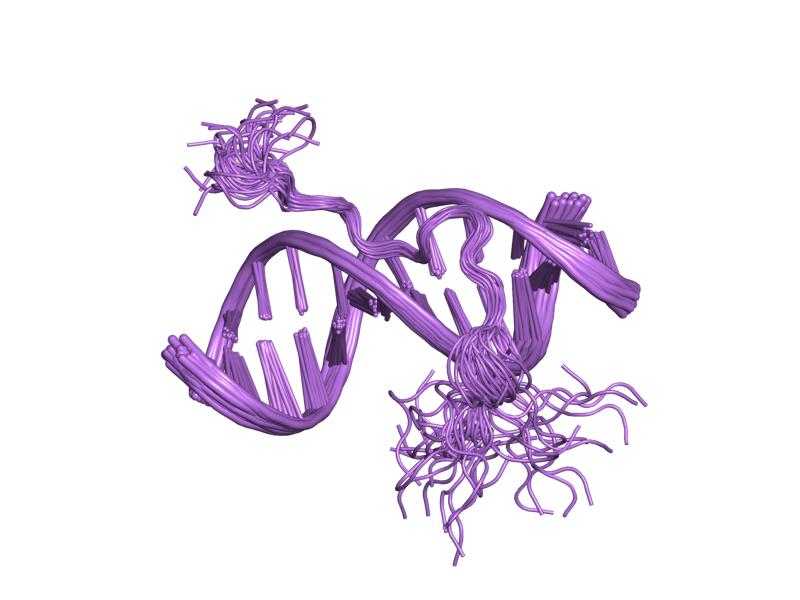
- solution structure of a complex of the second DNA binding domain of human hmg-i(y) bound to DNA dodecamer containing the PRDII site of the interferon-beta promoter, NMR, 35 structures

Identifiers
- Symbol: AT_hook
- Pfam: PF02178
- InterPro: IPR017956
- SMART: AT_hook
- SCOP2: 2eze / SCOPe / SUPFAM
Available protein structures:
- PDB: IPR017956 PF02178 (ECOD; PDBsum)
- AlphaFold: IPR017956; PF02178

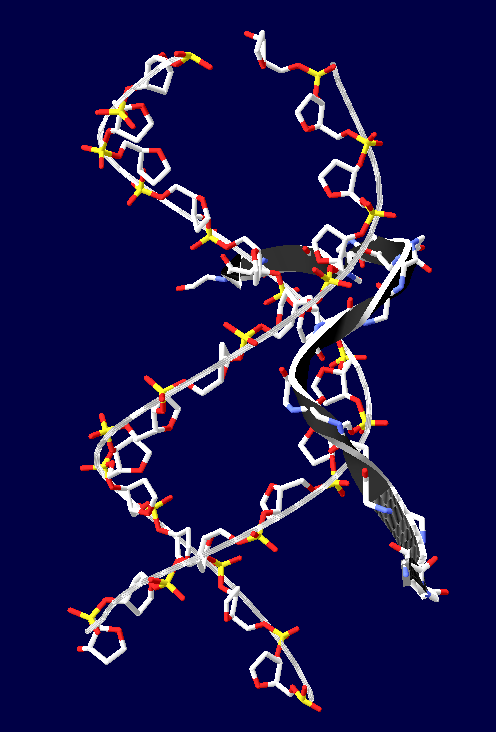
The second AT-hook of HMGA1 (black ribbon) bound to the minor-groove of AT-rich DNA. The amino-acid side chains and nucleotides have been hidden.

The AT-hook is a DNA-binding motif present in many proteins, including the high-mobility group (HMG) proteins, DNA-binding proteins from plants and hBRG1 protein, a central ATPase of the human switching/sucrose non-fermenting (SWI/SNF) remodeling complex.

== Structure ==
This motif consists of a conserved, palindromic, core sequence of proline-arginine-glycine-arginine-proline, although some AT-hooks contain only a single proline in the core sequence. AT-hooks also include a variable number of positively charged lysine and arginine residues on either side of the core sequence. The AT-hook binds to the minor groove of adenine-thymine (AT) rich DNA, hence the AT in the name. The rest of the name derives from a predicted asparagine/aspartate "hook" in the earliest AT-hooks reported in 1990. In 1997 structural studies using NMR determined that a DNA-bound AT-hook adopted a crescent or hook shape around the minor groove of a target DNA strand (pictured at right). HMGA proteins contain three AT-hooks, although some proteins contain as many as 30. The optimal binding sequences for AT-hook proteins are repeats of the form (ATAA)_{n} or (TATT)_{n}, although the optimal binding sequences for the core sequence of the AT-hook are AAAT and AATT.

The DNA dodecamer has eight consecutive AT base pairs, allowing the AT-hook to be positioned in several positions, with the preferred position being at one of the AATT regions to fully occupy the minor groove. Van der Waals interactions of the AT-hook with the adenines play an important role for the specificity of the position. Van der Waals interactions of the AT-hook with the adenines play an important role for the specificity of the position.

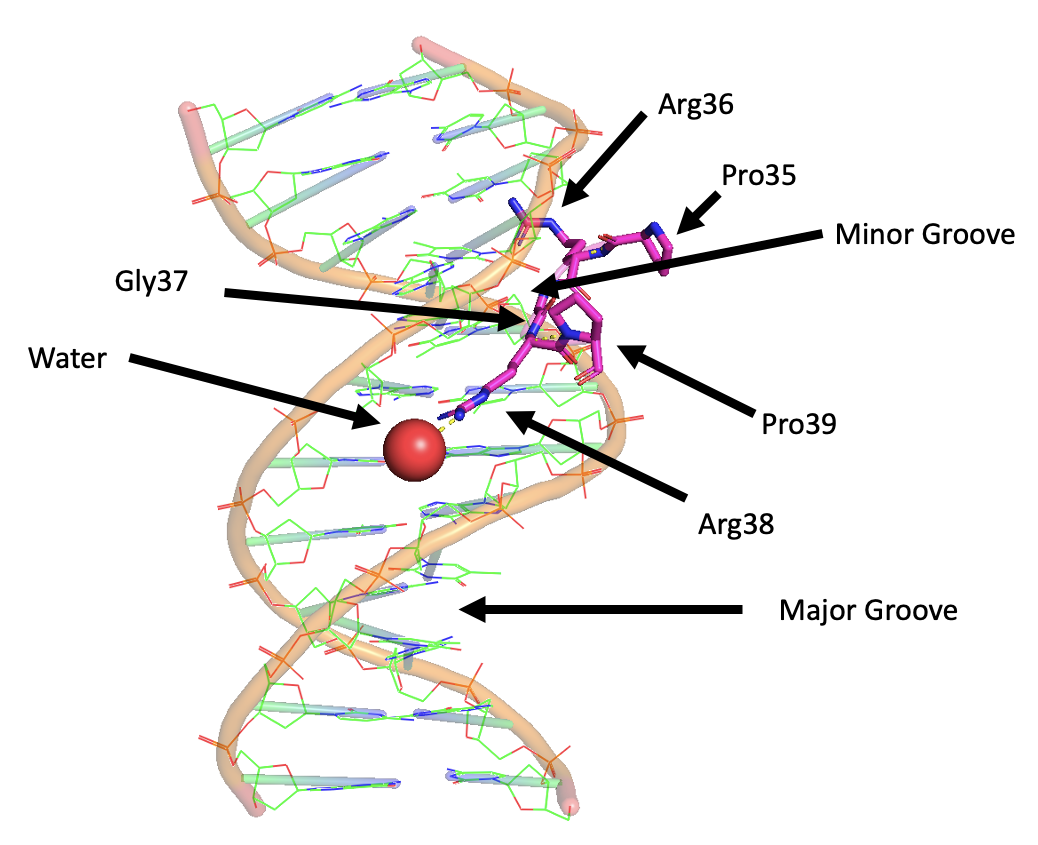
The phosphate backbone of the DNA shown in orange is faded to focus on the central region of the AT-hook. Shown in magenta are the side chains Pro35, Arg36, Gly37, Arg38, and Pro39. Made with PyMol. PDB code: 3UXW.

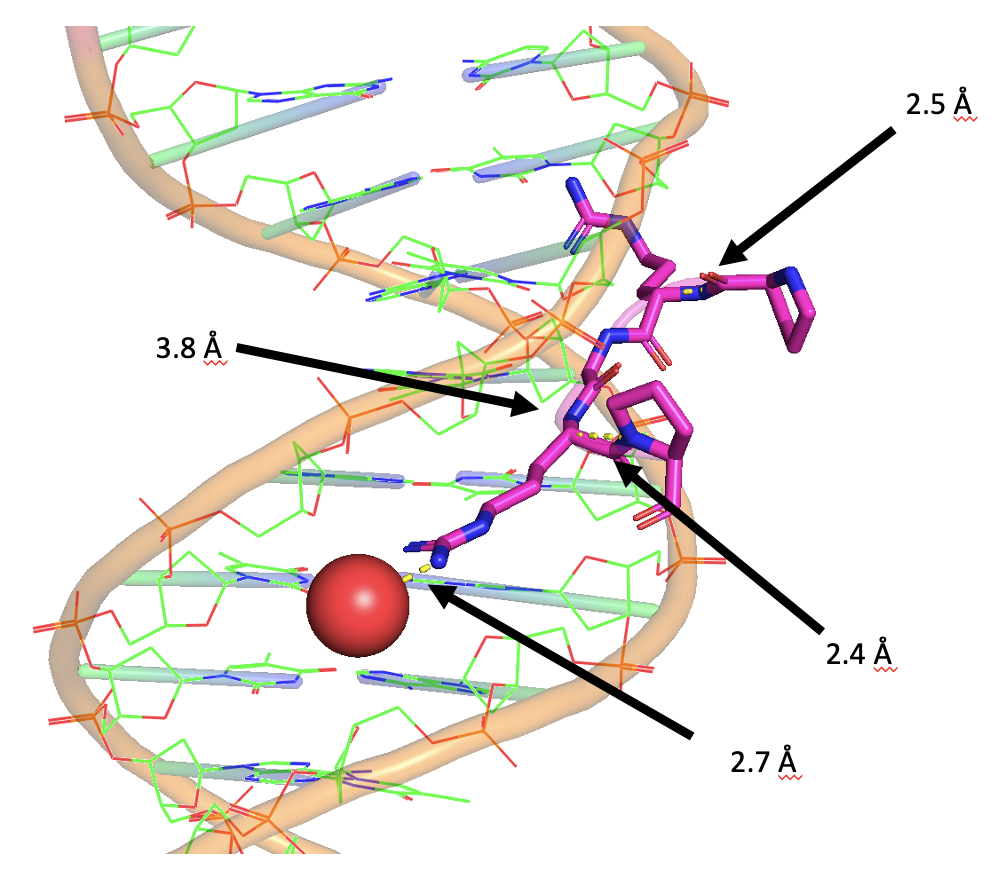
There are multiple hydrogen bonds shown in yellow. The interactions occur between Arg38 and Pro39 (3.8 Å), Pro35 and Arg36 (2.5 Å), and Gly37 and Arg38 (2.4 Å). The red sphere represents a water that forms a hydrogen bond 2.7 Å from Arg38 with the bond shown in yellow. Made with PyMol. PDB code: 3UXW.

The figure shows the position of the main chain to allow hydrogen bonds with the minor groove thymine oxygen atoms. The interactions shown, caused the DNA to bend, extending the minor groove. The distorted DNA causes the complementary major groove to form interactions between the side chains.

== Function ==
AT-hook proteins can form hydrogen bonds between NH groups of Gly37 and Arg38 on the main-chain and thymine oxygen atoms in the minor groove, which bends the DNA and widens the minor groove. The binding to the minor groove facilitates binding of other proteins in the major groove. That enables HMG proteins to regular expression of genes and influence biological processes.

The AT-hooks have also been proposed to anchor chromatin-modifying proteins to AT-rich DNA sequences through their association with chromatin remodeling, histone modifications, and chromatin insulator function.

== Clinical significance ==
Alterations or abnormal expression of the HMG proteins have led to metabolic disorders, such as obesity, type 2 diabetes, and cancer.
