= TOX4 =

Protein-coding gene in humans

Identifiers
- Aliases: TOX4, C14orf92, KIAA0737, LCP1, MIG7, TOX high mobility group box family member 4
- External IDs: OMIM: 614032; MGI: 1915389; GeneCards: TOX4

Gene location (Human)
Chr.	Chromosome 14 (human)
Band	14q11.2	Start	21,476,597 bp
Band	14q11.2	End	21,499,175 bp

Gene location (Mouse)
Chr.	Chromosome 14 (mouse)
Band	14|14 C2	Start	52,516,603 bp
Band	14|14 C2	End	52,533,858 bp
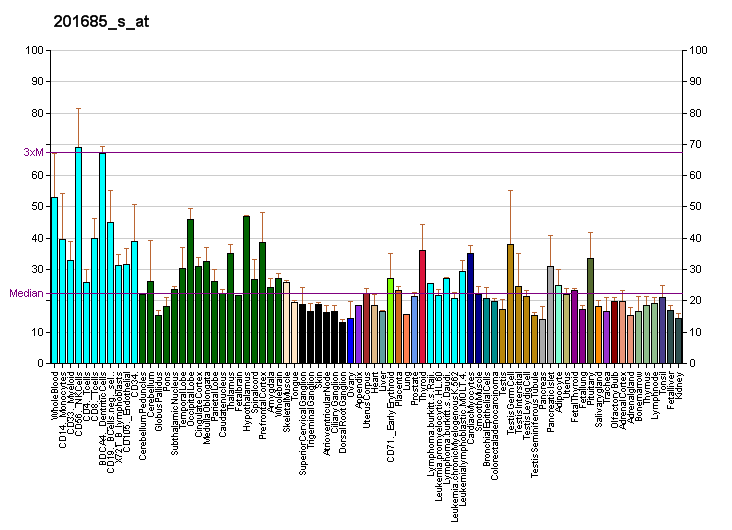

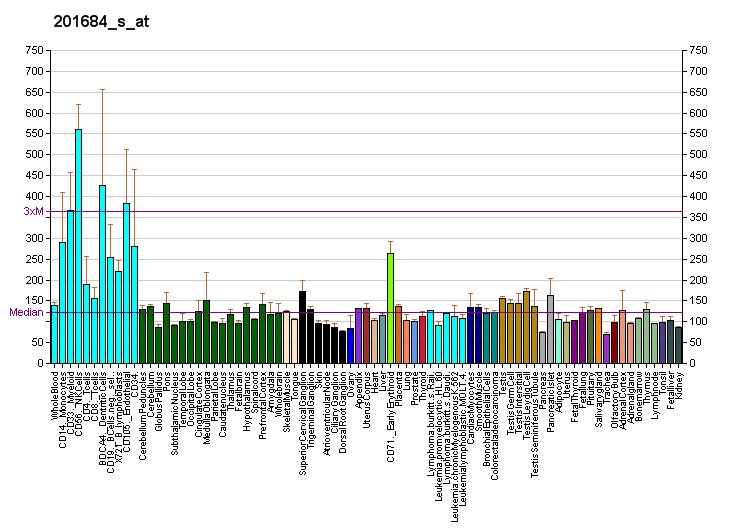

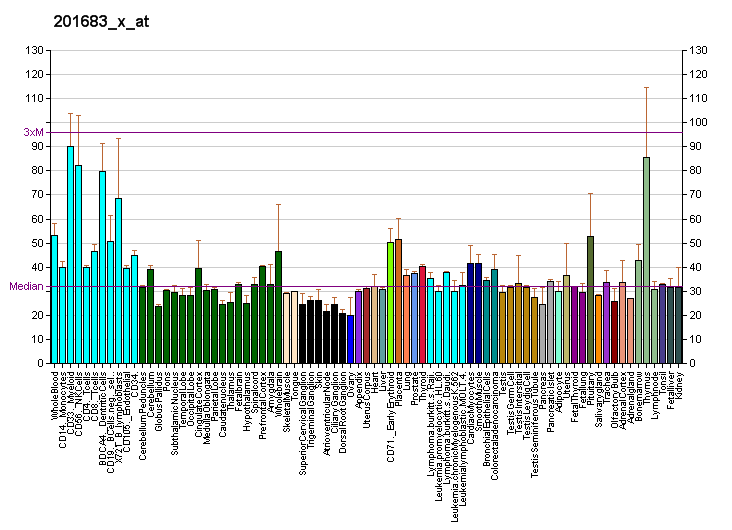
RNA expression pattern
Bgee	Human / Mouse (ortholog); Top expressed in: epithelium of colon; islet of Langerhans; stromal cell of endometrium; gastrocnemius muscle; bone marrow cell; beta cell; smooth muscle tissue; muscle of thigh; monocyte; tonsil / Top expressed in: spermatocyte; Rostral migratory stream; Paneth cell; facial motor nucleus; spermatid; triceps brachii muscle; seminal vesicula; barrel cortex; sternocleidomastoid muscle; submandibular gland; More reference expression data
BioGPS	More reference expression data
Gene ontology
Molecular function	DNA binding; protein binding; DNA-binding transcription factor activity, RNA polymerase II-specific
Cellular component	chromatin; nucleus; PTW/PP1 phosphatase complex
Biological process	regulation of transcription by RNA polymerase II
Sources:Amigo / QuickGO
Orthologs
Databases	NCBI: entry; OMA: entry
Species	Human	Mouse
Entrez	9878	268741
Ensembl	ENSG00000092203	ENSMUSG00000016831
UniProt	O94842	Q8BU11
RefSeq (mRNA)	NM_014828; NM_001303523	NM_023434
RefSeq (protein)	NP_001290452; NP_055643	NP_075923
Location (UCSC)	Chr 14: 21.48 – 21.5 Mb	Chr 14: 52.52 – 52.53 Mb
PubMed search
- Wikidata
View/Edit Human	View/Edit Mouse

TOX high mobility group box family member 4 (or TOX4) is a protein that in humans is encoded by the gene TOX4 (previously KIAA0737). This TOX-family protein functions as a transcription factor that regulates cell fate determination.
