= HMG-box =

Protein domain which is involved in DNA binding

HMG (high-mobility group) box
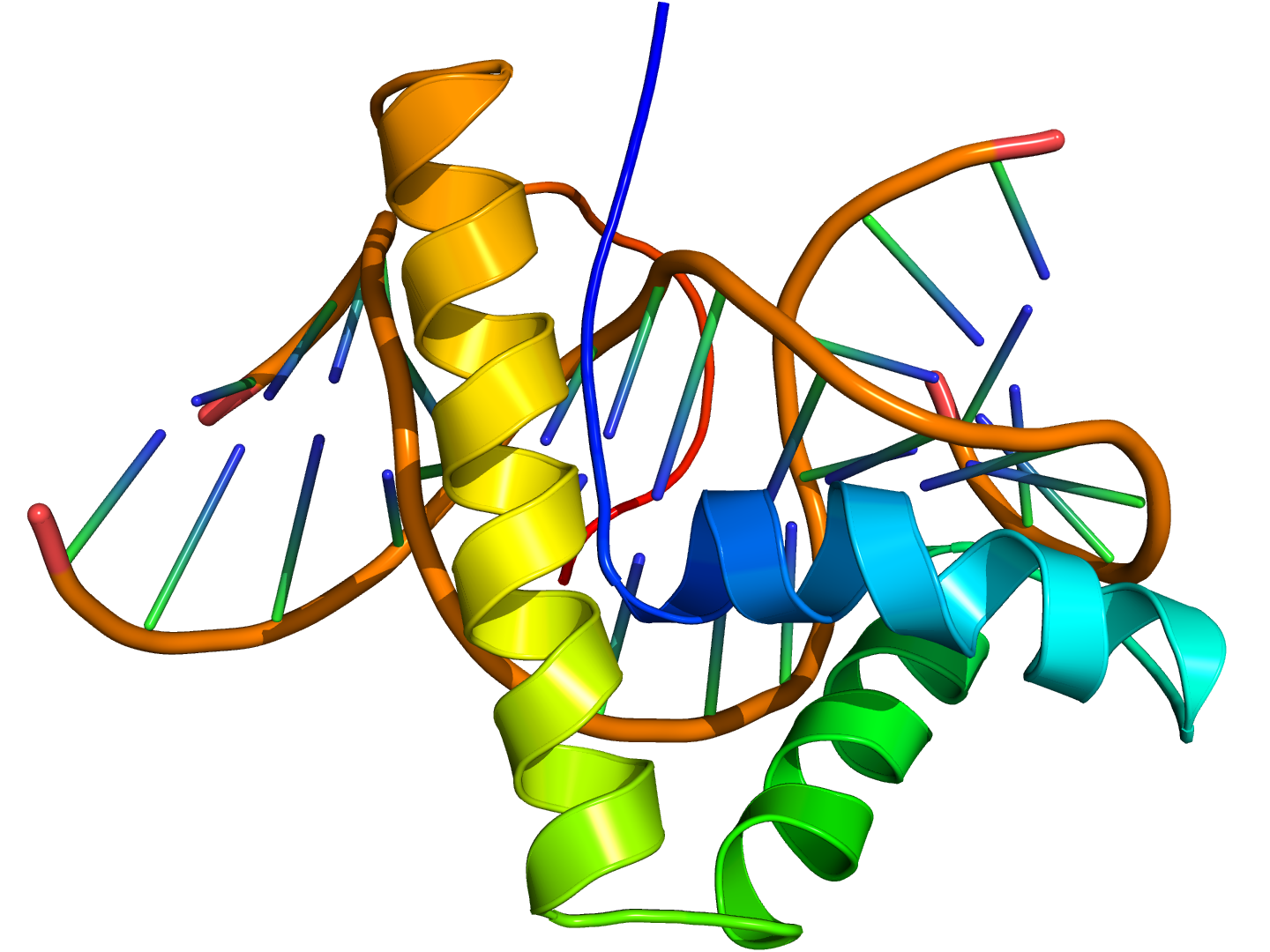
- NMR structure of the HMG-box domain of the LEF1 protein (rainbow colored, N-terminus = blue, C-terminus = red) complexed with DNA (brown) based on the PDB: 2LEF coordinates.

Identifiers
- Symbol: PF00505
- Pfam: PF00505
- Pfam clan: CL0114
- ECOD: 190.1.1
- InterPro: IPR009071
- SCOP2: 1hsm / SCOPe / SUPFAM
Available protein structures:
- PDB: 1aab, 1cg7, 1ckt, 1e7j, 1gt0, 1hme, 1hmf, 1hry, 1hrz, 1hsm, 1hsn, 1i11, 1j3x, 1j46, 1j47, 1j5n, 1k99, 1lwm, 1nhm, 1nhn, 1o4x, 1qrv, 1s9m, 1sx9, 1v64, 1wgf, 1wxl, 2crj, 2cs1, 2lef IPR009071 PF00505 (ECOD; PDBsum)
- AlphaFold: IPR009071; PF00505

In molecular biology, the HMG-box (high-mobility group box) is a protein domain which is involved in DNA binding. The domain is composed of approximately 75 amino acid residues that collectively mediate the DNA-binding of chromatin-associated high-mobility group proteins. HMG-boxes are present in many transcription factors and chromatin-remodeling complexes, where they can mediate non-sequence or sequence-specific DNA binding.

== Structure ==
The structure of the HMG-box domain contains three alpha helices separated by loops (see figure to the right).

== Function ==
HMG-box containing proteins only bind non-B-type DNA conformations (kinked or unwound) with high affinity. HMG-box domains are found in some high-mobility group proteins, which are involved in the regulation of DNA-dependent processes such as transcription, replication, and DNA repair, all of which require changing the conformation of chromatin. The single and the double box HMG proteins alter DNA architecture by inducing bends upon binding.
