= List of MeSH codes (D12.776) =

The following is a partial list of the "D" codes for Medical Subject Headings (MeSH), as defined by the United States National Library of Medicine (NLM).

This list continues the information at List of MeSH codes (D12.644). Codes following these are found at List of MeSH codes (D13). For other MeSH codes, see List of MeSH codes.

The source for this content is the set of 2006 MeSH Trees from the NLM.

== MeSH D12.776.070 – apoproteins ==
=== MeSH D12.776.070.400 – apolipoproteins ===
==== MeSH D12.776.070.400.200 – apolipoprotein A ====
- MeSH D12.776.070.400.200.100 – apolipoprotein A1
- MeSH D12.776.070.400.200.150 – apolipoprotein A2

== MeSH D12.776.097 – bacterial proteins ==
See List of MeSH codes (D12.776.097).

== MeSH D12.776.124 – blood proteins ==
See List of MeSH codes (D12.776.124).

== MeSH D12.776.157 – carrier proteins ==
See List of MeSH codes (D12.776.157).

== MeSH D12.776.167 – cell cycle proteins ==
=== MeSH D12.776.167.200 – cyclin-dependent kinases ===
==== MeSH D12.776.167.200.067 – cdc2-cdc28 kinases ====
- MeSH D12.776.167.200.067.249 – cdc2 protein kinase
- MeSH D12.776.167.200.067.500 – cdc28 protein kinase, s cerevisiae
- MeSH D12.776.167.200.067.875 – cyclin-dependent kinase 5
- MeSH D12.776.167.200.067.900 – cyclin-dependent kinase 9

==== MeSH D12.776.167.200.580 – maturation-promoting factor ====
- MeSH D12.776.167.200.580.500 – cdc2 protein kinase

== MeSH D12.776.210 – contractile proteins ==
=== MeSH D12.776.210.500 – muscle proteins ===
==== MeSH D12.776.210.500.410 – dystrophin-associated proteins ====
- MeSH D12.776.210.500.410.500 – dystroglycans
- MeSH D12.776.210.500.410.750 – sarcoglycans

==== MeSH D12.776.210.500.570 – myogenic regulatory factors ====
- MeSH D12.776.210.500.570.590 – myod protein
- MeSH D12.776.210.500.570.595 – myogenic regulatory factor 5
- MeSH D12.776.210.500.570.600 – myogenin

==== MeSH D12.776.210.500.600 – myosins ====
- MeSH D12.776.210.500.600.100 – myosin heavy chains
- MeSH D12.776.210.500.600.200 – myosin light chains
- MeSH D12.776.210.500.600.300 – myosin subfragments
- MeSH D12.776.210.500.600.465 – myosin type i
- MeSH D12.776.210.500.600.470 – myosin type ii
- MeSH D12.776.210.500.600.470.249 – cardiac myosins
- MeSH D12.776.210.500.600.470.249.249 – atrial myosins
- MeSH D12.776.210.500.600.470.249.500 – ventricular myosins
- MeSH D12.776.210.500.600.470.374 – nonmuscle myosin type iia
- MeSH D12.776.210.500.600.470.500 – nonmuscle myosin type iib
- MeSH D12.776.210.500.600.470.750 – skeletal muscle myosins
- MeSH D12.776.210.500.600.470.875 – smooth muscle myosins

==== MeSH D12.776.210.500.910 – troponin ====
- MeSH D12.776.210.500.910.900 – troponin c
- MeSH D12.776.210.500.910.925 – troponin i
- MeSH D12.776.210.500.910.962 – troponin t

== MeSH D12.776.220 – cytoskeletal proteins ==
=== MeSH D12.776.220.525 – microfilament proteins ===
==== MeSH D12.776.220.525.032 – actin capping proteins ====
- MeSH D12.776.220.525.032.500 – capz actin capping protein
- MeSH D12.776.220.525.032.750 – tropomodulin

==== MeSH D12.776.220.525.212 – actin depolymerizing factors ====
- MeSH D12.776.220.525.212.500 – cofilin 1
- MeSH D12.776.220.525.212.750 – cofilin 2
- MeSH D12.776.220.525.212.875 – destrin

==== MeSH D12.776.220.525.246 – actin-related protein 2-3 complex ====
- MeSH D12.776.220.525.246.500 – actin-related protein 2
- MeSH D12.776.220.525.246.750 – actin-related protein 3

==== MeSH D12.776.220.525.475 – myosins ====
- MeSH D12.776.220.525.475.100 – myosin heavy chains
- MeSH D12.776.220.525.475.200 – myosin light chains
- MeSH D12.776.220.525.475.300 – myosin subfragments
- MeSH D12.776.220.525.475.470 – myosin type i
- MeSH D12.776.220.525.475.475 – myosin type ii
- MeSH D12.776.220.525.475.475.124 – cardiac myosins
- MeSH D12.776.220.525.475.475.124.249 – atrial myosins
- MeSH D12.776.220.525.475.475.124.500 – ventricular myosins
- MeSH D12.776.220.525.475.475.249 – nonmuscle myosin type iia
- MeSH D12.776.220.525.475.475.500 – nonmuscle myosin type iib
- MeSH D12.776.220.525.475.475.750 – skeletal muscle myosins
- MeSH D12.776.220.525.475.475.875 – smooth muscle myosins
- MeSH D12.776.220.525.475.612 – myosin type iii
- MeSH D12.776.220.525.475.681 – myosin type iv
- MeSH D12.776.220.525.475.750 – myosin type v

==== MeSH D12.776.220.525.825 – troponin ====
- MeSH D12.776.220.525.825.900 – troponin c
- MeSH D12.776.220.525.825.925 – troponin i
- MeSH D12.776.220.525.825.962 – troponin t

==== MeSH D12.776.220.525.912 – wiskott-aldrich syndrome protein family ====
- MeSH D12.776.220.525.912.500 – wiskott-aldrich syndrome protein
- MeSH D12.776.220.525.912.550 – wiskott-aldrich syndrome protein, neuronal

=== MeSH D12.776.220.600 – microtubule proteins ===
==== MeSH D12.776.220.600.450 – microtubule-associated proteins ====
- MeSH D12.776.220.600.450.200 – dynamins
- MeSH D12.776.220.600.450.200.100 – dynamin i
- MeSH D12.776.220.600.450.200.200 – dynamin ii
- MeSH D12.776.220.600.450.200.300 – dynamin iii
- MeSH D12.776.220.600.450.450 – kinesin
- MeSH D12.776.220.600.450.480 – stathmin
- MeSH D12.776.220.600.450.510 – tau proteins

== MeSH D12.776.256 – dietary proteins ==
=== MeSH D12.776.256.317 – egg proteins, dietary ===
==== MeSH D12.776.256.317.663 – ovalbumin ====
- MeSH D12.776.256.317.663.300 – avidin

=== MeSH D12.776.256.626 – milk proteins ===
==== MeSH D12.776.256.626.632 – lactoglobulins ====
- MeSH D12.776.256.626.632.507 – lactoferrin

== MeSH D12.776.260 – dna-binding proteins ==
See List of MeSH codes (D12.776.260).

== MeSH D12.776.306 – eye proteins ==
=== MeSH D12.776.306.366 – crystallins ===
==== MeSH D12.776.306.366.100 – alpha-crystallins ====
- MeSH D12.776.306.366.100.149 – alpha-crystallin a chain
- MeSH D12.776.306.366.100.300 – alpha-crystallin b chain

==== MeSH D12.776.306.366.300 – beta-crystallins ====
- MeSH D12.776.306.366.300.100 – beta-crystallin a chain
- MeSH D12.776.306.366.300.200 – beta-crystallin b chain

== MeSH D12.776.331 – flavoproteins ==
=== MeSH D12.776.331.199 – electron-transferring flavoproteins ===
==== MeSH D12.776.331.199.750 – electron transport complex ii ====
- MeSH D12.776.331.199.750.500 – succinate dehydrogenase

== MeSH D12.776.377 – globulins ==
=== MeSH D12.776.377.715 – serum globulins ===
==== MeSH D12.776.377.715.085 – alpha-globulins ====
- MeSH D12.776.377.715.085.050 – alpha 1-antichymotrypsin
- MeSH D12.776.377.715.085.085 – alpha 1-antitrypsin
- MeSH D12.776.377.715.085.100 – alpha-macroglobulins
- MeSH D12.776.377.715.085.118 – antiplasmin
- MeSH D12.776.377.715.085.125 – antithrombin iii
- MeSH D12.776.377.715.085.214 – ceruloplasmin
- MeSH D12.776.377.715.085.394 – haptoglobins
- MeSH D12.776.377.715.085.450 – heparin cofactor ii
- MeSH D12.776.377.715.085.640 – orosomucoid
- MeSH D12.776.377.715.085.740 – progesterone-binding globulin
- MeSH D12.776.377.715.085.750 – retinol-binding proteins
- MeSH D12.776.377.715.085.901 – transcortin

==== MeSH D12.776.377.715.182 – beta-globulins ====
- MeSH D12.776.377.715.182.100 – beta-2 microglobulin
- MeSH D12.776.377.715.182.160 – beta-thromboglobulin
- MeSH D12.776.377.715.182.200 – complement factor h
- MeSH D12.776.377.715.182.338 – hemopexin
- MeSH D12.776.377.715.182.580 – plasminogen
- MeSH D12.776.377.715.182.580.500 – angiostatins
- MeSH D12.776.377.715.182.624 – properdin
- MeSH D12.776.377.715.182.800 – sex hormone-binding globulin
- MeSH D12.776.377.715.182.839 – transferrin

==== MeSH D12.776.377.715.548 – immunoglobulins ====
- MeSH D12.776.377.715.548.114 – antibodies
- MeSH D12.776.377.715.548.114.071 – antibodies, anti-idiotypic
- MeSH D12.776.377.715.548.114.107 – antibodies, archaeal
- MeSH D12.776.377.715.548.114.125 – antibodies, bacterial
- MeSH D12.776.377.715.548.114.125.288 – antistreptolysin
- MeSH D12.776.377.715.548.114.134 – antibodies, bispecific
- MeSH D12.776.377.715.548.114.143 – antibodies, blocking
- MeSH D12.776.377.715.548.114.167 – antibodies, catalytic
- MeSH D12.776.377.715.548.114.179 – antibodies, fungal
- MeSH D12.776.377.715.548.114.185 – antibodies, helminth
- MeSH D12.776.377.715.548.114.191 – antibodies, heterophile
- MeSH D12.776.377.715.548.114.224 – antibodies, monoclonal
- MeSH D12.776.377.715.548.114.224.570 – muromonab-cd3
- MeSH D12.776.377.715.548.114.240 – antibodies, neoplasm
- MeSH D12.776.377.715.548.114.248 – antibodies, phospho-specific
- MeSH D12.776.377.715.548.114.252 – antibodies, protozoan
- MeSH D12.776.377.715.548.114.254 – antibodies, viral
- MeSH D12.776.377.715.548.114.254.150 – deltaretrovirus antibodies
- MeSH D12.776.377.715.548.114.254.150.440 – hiv antibodies
- MeSH D12.776.377.715.548.114.254.150.500 – htlv-i antibodies
- MeSH D12.776.377.715.548.114.254.150.510 – htlv-ii antibodies
- MeSH D12.776.377.715.548.114.254.450 – hepatitis antibodies
- MeSH D12.776.377.715.548.114.254.450.251 – hepatitis a antibodies
- MeSH D12.776.377.715.548.114.254.450.504 – hepatitis b antibodies
- MeSH D12.776.377.715.548.114.254.450.510 – hepatitis c antibodies
- MeSH D12.776.377.715.548.114.257 – antigen-antibody complex
- MeSH D12.776.377.715.548.114.301 – antitoxins
- MeSH D12.776.377.715.548.114.301.138 – antivenins
- MeSH D12.776.377.715.548.114.301.268 – botulinum antitoxin
- MeSH D12.776.377.715.548.114.301.438 – diphtheria antitoxin
- MeSH D12.776.377.715.548.114.301.849 – tetanus antitoxin
- MeSH D12.776.377.715.548.114.323 – autoantibodies
- MeSH D12.776.377.715.548.114.323.190 – antibodies, antineutrophil cytoplasmic
- MeSH D12.776.377.715.548.114.323.204 – antibodies, antinuclear
- MeSH D12.776.377.715.548.114.323.210 – antibodies, antiphospholipid
- MeSH D12.776.377.715.548.114.323.210.100 – antibodies, anticardiolipin
- MeSH D12.776.377.715.548.114.323.210.600 – lupus coagulation inhibitor
- MeSH D12.776.377.715.548.114.323.300 – complement c3 nephritic factor
- MeSH D12.776.377.715.548.114.323.390 – immunoconglutinins
- MeSH D12.776.377.715.548.114.323.480 – immunoglobulins, thyroid-stimulating
- MeSH D12.776.377.715.548.114.323.480.500 – long-acting thyroid stimulator
- MeSH D12.776.377.715.548.114.323.732 – rheumatoid factor
- MeSH D12.776.377.715.548.114.345 – binding sites, antibody
- MeSH D12.776.377.715.548.114.345.180 – complementarity determining regions
- MeSH D12.776.377.715.548.114.525 – hemolysins
- MeSH D12.776.377.715.548.114.573 – immune sera
- MeSH D12.776.377.715.548.114.573.203 – antilymphocyte serum
- MeSH D12.776.377.715.548.114.580 – immunoconjugates
- MeSH D12.776.377.715.548.114.580.450 – immunotoxins
- MeSH D12.776.377.715.548.114.606 – immunoglobulin allotypes
- MeSH D12.776.377.715.548.114.606.586 – immunoglobulin gm allotypes
- MeSH D12.776.377.715.548.114.606.587 – immunoglobulin km allotypes
- MeSH D12.776.377.715.548.114.619 – immunoglobulin isotypes
- MeSH D12.776.377.715.548.114.619.026 – immunoglobulin a
- MeSH D12.776.377.715.548.114.619.026.030 – immunoglobulin a, secretory
- MeSH D12.776.377.715.548.114.619.026.030.500 – secretory component
- MeSH D12.776.377.715.548.114.619.026.515 – immunoglobulin alpha-chains
- MeSH D12.776.377.715.548.114.619.251 – immunoglobulin d
- MeSH D12.776.377.715.548.114.619.251.500 – immunoglobulin delta-chains
- MeSH D12.776.377.715.548.114.619.312 – immunoglobulin e
- MeSH D12.776.377.715.548.114.619.312.500 – immunoglobulin epsilon-chains
- MeSH D12.776.377.715.548.114.619.393 – immunoglobulin g
- MeSH D12.776.377.715.548.114.619.393.522 – immunoglobulin gamma-chains
- MeSH D12.776.377.715.548.114.619.393.522.400 – immunoglobulin gm allotypes
- MeSH D12.776.377.715.548.114.619.393.550 – long-acting thyroid stimulator
- MeSH D12.776.377.715.548.114.619.393.570 – muromonab-cd3
- MeSH D12.776.377.715.548.114.619.393.700 – rho(d) immune globulin
- MeSH D12.776.377.715.548.114.619.574 – immunoglobulin m
- MeSH D12.776.377.715.548.114.619.574.500 – immunoglobulin mu-chains
- MeSH D12.776.377.715.548.114.632 – immunoglobulins, intravenous
- MeSH D12.776.377.715.548.114.648 – immunoglobulins, thyroid-stimulating
- MeSH D12.776.377.715.548.114.656 – insulin antibodies
- MeSH D12.776.377.715.548.114.664 – isoantibodies
- MeSH D12.776.377.715.548.114.715 – oligoclonal bands
- MeSH D12.776.377.715.548.114.767 – opsonin proteins
- MeSH D12.776.377.715.548.114.820 – plantibodies
- MeSH D12.776.377.715.548.114.837 – precipitins
- MeSH D12.776.377.715.548.114.890 – reagins
- MeSH D12.776.377.715.548.397 – gamma-globulins
- MeSH D12.776.377.715.548.397.500 – tuftsin
- MeSH D12.776.377.715.548.538 – immunoglobulin constant regions
- MeSH D12.776.377.715.548.538.249 – immunoglobulin fab fragments
- MeSH D12.776.377.715.548.538.500 – immunoglobulin fc fragments
- MeSH D12.776.377.715.548.538.500.249 – cd4 immunoadhesins
- MeSH D12.776.377.715.548.680 – immunoglobulin fragments
- MeSH D12.776.377.715.548.680.650 – immunoglobulin fab fragments
- MeSH D12.776.377.715.548.680.650.500 – immunoglobulin variable region
- MeSH D12.776.377.715.548.680.650.500.180 – complementarity determining regions
- MeSH D12.776.377.715.548.680.650.500.590 – immunoglobulin joining region
- MeSH D12.776.377.715.548.680.650.750 – tuftsin
- MeSH D12.776.377.715.548.680.660 – immunoglobulin fc fragments
- MeSH D12.776.377.715.548.680.660.249 – cd4 immunoadhesins
- MeSH D12.776.377.715.548.680.660.500 – immunoglobulin constant regions
- MeSH D12.776.377.715.548.680.745 – immunoglobulin idiotypes
- MeSH D12.776.377.715.548.705 – immunoglobulin subunits
- MeSH D12.776.377.715.548.705.500 – immunoglobulin heavy chains
- MeSH D12.776.377.715.548.705.500.350 – immunoglobulin alpha-chains
- MeSH D12.776.377.715.548.705.500.360 – immunoglobulin delta-chains
- MeSH D12.776.377.715.548.705.500.370 – immunoglobulin epsilon-chains
- MeSH D12.776.377.715.548.705.500.380 – immunoglobulin gamma-chains
- MeSH D12.776.377.715.548.705.500.380.500 – immunoglobulin gm allotypes
- MeSH D12.776.377.715.548.705.500.500 – immunoglobulin mu-chains
- MeSH D12.776.377.715.548.705.625 – immunoglobulin j-chains
- MeSH D12.776.377.715.548.705.750 – immunoglobulin light chains
- MeSH D12.776.377.715.548.705.750.530 – immunoglobulin kappa-chains
- MeSH D12.776.377.715.548.705.750.530.500 – immunoglobulin km allotypes
- MeSH D12.776.377.715.548.705.750.550 – immunoglobulin lambda-chains
- MeSH D12.776.377.715.548.705.875 – secretory component
- MeSH D12.776.377.715.548.797 – immunoglobulin variable region
- MeSH D12.776.377.715.548.797.180 – complementarity determining regions
- MeSH D12.776.377.715.548.797.570 – immunoglobulin fab fragments
- MeSH D12.776.377.715.548.797.590 – immunoglobulin joining region
- MeSH D12.776.377.715.548.900 – paraproteins
- MeSH D12.776.377.715.548.900.120 – bence jones protein
- MeSH D12.776.377.715.548.900.225 – cryoglobulins
- MeSH D12.776.377.715.548.900.500 – myeloma proteins
- MeSH D12.776.377.715.548.900.700 – pyroglobulins
- MeSH D12.776.377.715.548.950 – receptors, antigen, b-cell
- MeSH D12.776.377.715.548.950.500 – antigens, cd79

==== MeSH D12.776.377.715.647 – macroglobulins ====
- MeSH D12.776.377.715.647.100 – alpha-macroglobulins

== MeSH D12.776.395 – glycoproteins ==
See List of MeSH codes (D12.776.395).

== MeSH D12.776.402 – gtp-binding protein regulators ==
=== MeSH D12.776.402.150 – gtpase-activating proteins ===
==== MeSH D12.776.402.150.100 – chimerin proteins ====
- MeSH D12.776.402.150.100.200 – chimerin 1

==== MeSH D12.776.402.150.500 – ras gtpase-activating proteins ====
- MeSH D12.776.402.150.500.460 – neurofibromin 1
- MeSH D12.776.402.150.500.500 – p120 gtpase activating protein

=== MeSH D12.776.402.300 – guanine nucleotide exchange factors ===
==== MeSH D12.776.402.300.700 – ras guanine nucleotide exchange factors ====
- MeSH D12.776.402.300.700.500 – ras-GRF1
- MeSH D12.776.402.300.700.700 – son of sevenless proteins
- MeSH D12.776.402.300.700.700.330 – sos1 protein
- MeSH D12.776.402.300.700.700.600 – son of sevenless protein, drosophila

== MeSH D12.776.410 – heat-shock proteins ==
=== MeSH D12.776.410.210 – chaperonins ===
==== MeSH D12.776.410.210.175 – chaperonin 10 ====
- MeSH D12.776.410.210.175.325 – groes protein

==== MeSH D12.776.410.210.180 – chaperonin 60 ====
- MeSH D12.776.410.210.180.325 – groel protein

== MeSH D12.776.422 – hemeproteins ==
=== MeSH D12.776.422.220 – cytochromes ===
==== MeSH D12.776.422.220.175 – cytochrome a group ====
- MeSH D12.776.422.220.175.249 – cytochromes a
- MeSH D12.776.422.220.175.500 – cytochromes a1
- MeSH D12.776.422.220.175.600 – cytochromes a3

==== MeSH D12.776.422.220.187 – cytochrome b group ====
- MeSH D12.776.422.220.187.124 – cytochromes b6
- MeSH D12.776.422.220.187.249 – cytochromes b
- MeSH D12.776.422.220.187.500 – cytochromes b5

==== MeSH D12.776.422.220.286 – cytochrome c group ====
- MeSH D12.776.422.220.286.100 – cytochromes c
- MeSH D12.776.422.220.286.150 – cytochromes c'
- MeSH D12.776.422.220.286.200 – cytochromes c1
- MeSH D12.776.422.220.286.300 – cytochromes c2
- MeSH D12.776.422.220.286.600 – cytochromes c6

==== MeSH D12.776.422.220.453 – cytochrome p-450 enzyme system ====
- MeSH D12.776.422.220.453.040 – aryl hydrocarbon hydroxylases
- MeSH D12.776.422.220.453.040.050 – aniline hydroxylase
- MeSH D12.776.422.220.453.040.110 – benzopyrene hydroxylase
- MeSH D12.776.422.220.453.040.332 – cytochrome p-450 cyp1a1
- MeSH D12.776.422.220.453.040.555 – cytochrome p-450 cyp1a2
- MeSH D12.776.422.220.453.040.777 – cytochrome p-450 cyp2b1
- MeSH D12.776.422.220.453.040.888 – cytochrome p-450 cyp2d6
- MeSH D12.776.422.220.453.040.944 – cytochrome p-450 cyp2e1
- MeSH D12.776.422.220.453.040.972 – cytochrome p-450 cyp3a
- MeSH D12.776.422.220.453.085 – camphor 5-monooxygenase
- MeSH D12.776.422.220.453.915 – steroid hydroxylases
- MeSH D12.776.422.220.453.915.050 – aldosterone synthase
- MeSH D12.776.422.220.453.915.099 – aromatase
- MeSH D12.776.422.220.453.915.200 – cholesterol 7 alpha-hydroxylase
- MeSH D12.776.422.220.453.915.212 – cholesterol side-chain cleavage enzyme
- MeSH D12.776.422.220.453.915.400 – 25-hydroxyvitamin d3 1-alpha-hydroxylase
- MeSH D12.776.422.220.453.915.720 – steroid 11-beta-hydroxylase
- MeSH D12.776.422.220.453.915.730 – steroid 12-alpha-hydroxylase
- MeSH D12.776.422.220.453.915.737 – steroid 16-alpha-hydroxylase
- MeSH D12.776.422.220.453.915.748 – steroid 17-alpha-hydroxylase
- MeSH D12.776.422.220.453.915.760 – steroid 21-hydroxylase

=== MeSH D12.776.422.512 – hemoglobins ===
==== MeSH D12.776.422.512.380 – hemoglobin A ====
- MeSH D12.776.422.512.380.440 – hemoglobin a, glycosylated
- MeSH D12.776.422.512.380.450 – hemoglobin A2

==== MeSH D12.776.422.512.426 – hemoglobins, abnormal ====
- MeSH D12.776.422.512.426.338 – hemoglobin C
- MeSH D12.776.422.512.426.375 – hemoglobin E
- MeSH D12.776.422.512.426.463 – hemoglobin H
- MeSH D12.776.422.512.426.480 – hemoglobin J
- MeSH D12.776.422.512.426.510 – hemoglobin M
- MeSH D12.776.422.512.426.588 – hemoglobin, sickle

== MeSH D12.776.467 – intercellular signaling peptides and proteins ==
=== MeSH D12.776.467.100 – angiogenic proteins ===
==== MeSH D12.776.467.100.100 – angiopoietins ====
- MeSH D12.776.467.100.100.100 – angiopoietin-1
- MeSH D12.776.467.100.100.200 – angiopoietin-2

==== MeSH D12.776.467.100.450 – angiostatic proteins ====
- MeSH D12.776.467.100.450.500 – angiostatins
- MeSH D12.776.467.100.450.750 – endostatins

==== MeSH D12.776.467.100.800 – vascular endothelial growth factors ====
- MeSH D12.776.467.100.800.200 – vascular endothelial growth factor a
- MeSH D12.776.467.100.800.300 – vascular endothelial growth factor b
- MeSH D12.776.467.100.800.400 – vascular endothelial growth factor c
- MeSH D12.776.467.100.800.500 – vascular endothelial growth factor d
- MeSH D12.776.467.100.800.600 – vascular endothelial growth factor, endocrine-gland-derived

=== MeSH D12.776.467.374 – cytokines ===
==== MeSH D12.776.467.374.200 – chemokines ====
- MeSH D12.776.467.374.200.070 – beta-thromboglobulin
- MeSH D12.776.467.374.200.100 – chemokines, c
- MeSH D12.776.467.374.200.110 – chemokines, cc
- MeSH D12.776.467.374.200.120 – chemokines, cxc
- MeSH D12.776.467.374.200.130 – chemokines, cx3c
- MeSH D12.776.467.374.200.508 – interleukin-8
- MeSH D12.776.467.374.200.600 – macrophage inflammatory proteins
- MeSH D12.776.467.374.200.600.500 – macrophage inflammatory protein-1
- MeSH D12.776.467.374.200.610 – monocyte chemoattractant proteins
- MeSH D12.776.467.374.200.610.600 – monocyte chemoattractant protein-1
- MeSH D12.776.467.374.200.700 – platelet factor 4
- MeSH D12.776.467.374.200.750 – rantes

==== MeSH D12.776.467.374.400 – growth substances ====
- MeSH D12.776.467.374.400.442 – hematopoietic cell growth factors
- MeSH D12.776.467.374.400.442.240 – colony-stimulating factors
- MeSH D12.776.467.374.400.442.240.075 – colony-stimulating factors, recombinant
- MeSH D12.776.467.374.400.442.240.075.350 – granulocyte colony stimulating factor, recombinant
- MeSH D12.776.467.374.400.442.240.075.350.275 – filgrastim
- MeSH D12.776.467.374.400.442.240.075.375 – granulocyte macrophage colony-stimulating factors, recombinant
- MeSH D12.776.467.374.400.442.240.150 – erythropoietin
- MeSH D12.776.467.374.400.442.240.150.250 – erythropoietin, recombinant
- MeSH D12.776.467.374.400.442.240.150.250.250 – epoetin alfa
- MeSH D12.776.467.374.400.442.240.350 – granulocyte colony-stimulating factor
- MeSH D12.776.467.374.400.442.240.350.375 – granulocyte colony stimulating factor, recombinant
- MeSH D12.776.467.374.400.442.240.350.375.275 – filgrastim
- MeSH D12.776.467.374.400.442.240.375 – granulocyte-macrophage colony-stimulating factor
- MeSH D12.776.467.374.400.442.240.375.275 – granulocyte macrophage colony-stimulating factors, recombinant
- MeSH D12.776.467.374.400.442.240.400 – interleukin-3
- MeSH D12.776.467.374.400.442.240.500 – macrophage colony-stimulating factor
- MeSH D12.776.467.374.400.442.240.750 – thrombopoietin
- MeSH D12.776.467.374.400.442.800 – stem cell factor
- MeSH D12.776.467.374.400.505 – interleukins
- MeSH D12.776.467.374.400.505.501 – interleukin-1
- MeSH D12.776.467.374.400.505.502 – interleukin-2
- MeSH D12.776.467.374.400.505.503 – interleukin-3
- MeSH D12.776.467.374.400.505.504 – interleukin-4
- MeSH D12.776.467.374.400.505.505 – interleukin-5
- MeSH D12.776.467.374.400.505.506 – interleukin-6
- MeSH D12.776.467.374.400.505.507 – interleukin-7
- MeSH D12.776.467.374.400.505.508 – interleukin-8
- MeSH D12.776.467.374.400.505.509 – interleukin-9
- MeSH D12.776.467.374.400.505.510 – interleukin-10
- MeSH D12.776.467.374.400.505.511 – interleukin-11
- MeSH D12.776.467.374.400.505.512 – interleukin-12
- MeSH D12.776.467.374.400.505.513 – interleukin-13
- MeSH D12.776.467.374.400.505.514 – interleukin-14
- MeSH D12.776.467.374.400.505.515 – interleukin-15
- MeSH D12.776.467.374.400.505.516 – interleukin-16
- MeSH D12.776.467.374.400.505.517 – interleukin-17
- MeSH D12.776.467.374.400.505.518 – interleukin-18
- MeSH D12.776.467.374.400.800 – transforming growth factor beta

==== MeSH D12.776.467.374.440 – interferons ====
- MeSH D12.776.467.374.440.890 – interferon type i
- MeSH D12.776.467.374.440.890.125 – interferon type i, recombinant
- MeSH D12.776.467.374.440.890.125.100 – interferon alfa-2a
- MeSH D12.776.467.374.440.890.125.150 – interferon alfa-2b
- MeSH D12.776.467.374.440.890.125.200 – interferon alfa-2c
- MeSH D12.776.467.374.440.890.250 – interferon-alpha
- MeSH D12.776.467.374.440.890.250.100 – interferon alfa-2a
- MeSH D12.776.467.374.440.890.250.150 – interferon alfa-2b
- MeSH D12.776.467.374.440.890.250.200 – interferon alfa-2c
- MeSH D12.776.467.374.440.890.275 – interferon-beta
- MeSH D12.776.467.374.440.893 – interferon type ii
- MeSH D12.776.467.374.440.893.510 – interferon-gamma, recombinant

==== MeSH D12.776.467.374.480 – lymphokines ====
- MeSH D12.776.467.374.480.350 – interferon type ii
- MeSH D12.776.467.374.480.372 – interleukin-2
- MeSH D12.776.467.374.480.428 – leukocyte migration-inhibitory factors
- MeSH D12.776.467.374.480.438 – lymphotoxin
- MeSH D12.776.467.374.480.615 – macrophage-activating factors
- MeSH D12.776.467.374.480.615.350 – interferon type ii
- MeSH D12.776.467.374.480.625 – macrophage migration-inhibitory factors
- MeSH D12.776.467.374.480.640 – neuroleukin
- MeSH D12.776.467.374.480.700 – suppressor factors, immunologic
- MeSH D12.776.467.374.480.750 – transfer factor

==== MeSH D12.776.467.374.500 – monokines ====
- MeSH D12.776.467.374.500.400 – interleukin-1
- MeSH D12.776.467.374.500.800 – tumor necrosis factor-alpha

==== MeSH D12.776.467.374.750 – tumor necrosis factors ====
- MeSH D12.776.467.374.750.500 – lymphotoxin
- MeSH D12.776.467.374.750.750 – tumor necrosis factor-alpha

=== MeSH D12.776.467.750 – interferons ===
==== MeSH D12.776.467.750.500 – interferon type i ====
- MeSH D12.776.467.750.500.125 – interferon type i, recombinant
- MeSH D12.776.467.750.500.125.100 – interferon alfa-2a
- MeSH D12.776.467.750.500.125.150 – interferon alfa-2b
- MeSH D12.776.467.750.500.125.200 – interferon alfa-2c
- MeSH D12.776.467.750.500.250 – interferon-alpha
- MeSH D12.776.467.750.500.250.100 – interferon alfa-2a
- MeSH D12.776.467.750.500.250.150 – interferon alfa-2b
- MeSH D12.776.467.750.500.250.200 – interferon alfa-2c
- MeSH D12.776.467.750.500.275 – interferon-beta

==== MeSH D12.776.467.750.550 – interferon type ii ====
- MeSH D12.776.467.750.550.510 – interferon-gamma, recombinant

=== MeSH D12.776.467.875 – nerve growth factors ===
==== MeSH D12.776.467.875.381 – glial cell line-derived neurotrophic factors ====
- MeSH D12.776.467.875.381.500 – glial cell line-derived neurotrophic factor
- MeSH D12.776.467.875.381.750 – neurturin

==== MeSH D12.776.467.875.550 – neuregulins ====
- MeSH D12.776.467.875.550.750 – neuregulin-1

== MeSH D12.776.476 – intracellular signaling peptides and proteins ==
See List of MeSH codes (D12.776.476).

== MeSH D12.776.503 – lectins ==
=== MeSH D12.776.503.280 – lectins, c-type ===
==== MeSH D12.776.503.280.249 – collectins ====
- MeSH D12.776.503.280.249.500 – mannose-binding lectin
- MeSH D12.776.503.280.249.600 – pulmonary surfactant-associated protein a
- MeSH D12.776.503.280.249.625 – pulmonary surfactant-associated protein d

=== MeSH D12.776.503.499 – plant lectins ===
==== MeSH D12.776.503.499.968 – wheat germ agglutinins ====
- MeSH D12.776.503.499.968.900 – wheat germ agglutinin-horseradish peroxidase conjugate

== MeSH D12.776.543 – membrane proteins ==
See List of MeSH codes (D12.776.543).

== MeSH D12.776.556 – metalloproteins ==
=== MeSH D12.776.556.579 – iron-binding proteins ===
==== MeSH D12.776.556.579.249 – ferritin ====
- MeSH D12.776.556.579.249.290 – apoferritin

==== MeSH D12.776.556.579.374 – nonheme iron proteins ====
- MeSH D12.776.556.579.374.187 – hemerythrin
- MeSH D12.776.556.579.374.281 – inositol oxygenase
- MeSH D12.776.556.579.374.375 – iron-sulfur proteins
- MeSH D12.776.556.579.374.375.025 – adrenodoxin
- MeSH D12.776.556.579.374.375.150 – ferredoxin-nitrite reductase
- MeSH D12.776.556.579.374.375.275 – ferredoxins
- MeSH D12.776.556.579.374.375.275.450 – molybdoferredoxin
- MeSH D12.776.556.579.374.375.275.725 – rubredoxins
- MeSH D12.776.556.579.374.375.637 – iron regulatory protein 1
- MeSH D12.776.556.579.374.375.818 – iron regulatory protein 2
- MeSH D12.776.556.579.374.375.863 – electron transport complex i
- MeSH D12.776.556.579.374.375.863.500 – nadh dehydrogenase
- MeSH D12.776.556.579.374.375.909 – electron transport complex ii
- MeSH D12.776.556.579.374.375.909.500 – succinate dehydrogenase
- MeSH D12.776.556.579.374.375.954 – electron transport complex iii
- MeSH D12.776.556.579.374.375.977 – nitrate reductase (nad(p)h)
- MeSH D12.776.556.579.374.375.988 – nitrate reductase (nadph)
- MeSH D12.776.556.579.374.450 – lipoxygenase
- MeSH D12.776.556.579.374.450.025 – arachidonate lipoxygenases
- MeSH D12.776.556.579.374.450.025.020 – arachidonate 5-lipoxygenase
- MeSH D12.776.556.579.374.450.025.025 – arachidonate 12-lipoxygenase
- MeSH D12.776.556.579.374.450.025.030 – arachidonate 15-lipoxygenase
- MeSH D12.776.556.579.374.687 – retinal dehydrogenase
- MeSH D12.776.556.579.374.925 – tyrosine 3-monooxygenase

== MeSH D12.776.575 – mitochondrial proteins ==
=== MeSH D12.776.575.750 – mitochondrial membrane transport proteins ===
==== MeSH D12.776.575.750.500 – mitochondrial adp, atp translocases ====
- MeSH D12.776.575.750.500.100 – adenine nucleotide translocator 1
- MeSH D12.776.575.750.500.200 – adenine nucleotide translocator 2
- MeSH D12.776.575.750.500.300 – adenine nucleotide translocator 3

== MeSH D12.776.580 – molecular chaperones ==
=== MeSH D12.776.580.210 – chaperonins ===
==== MeSH D12.776.580.210.175 – chaperonin 10 ====
- MeSH D12.776.580.210.175.325 – groes protein

==== MeSH D12.776.580.210.180 – chaperonin 60 ====
- MeSH D12.776.580.210.180.325 – groel protein

== MeSH D12.776.602 – mutant proteins ==
=== MeSH D12.776.602.500 – mutant chimeric proteins ===
==== MeSH D12.776.602.500.500 – oncogene proteins, fusion ====
- MeSH D12.776.602.500.500.100 – fusion proteins, bcr-abl
- MeSH D12.776.602.500.500.320 – fusion proteins, gag-onc
- MeSH D12.776.602.500.500.320.700 – oncogene protein p65(gag-jun)
- MeSH D12.776.602.500.500.660 – oncogene protein tpr-met

== MeSH D12.776.624 – neoplasm proteins ==
=== MeSH D12.776.624.664 – oncogene proteins ===
==== MeSH D12.776.624.664.500 – oncogene proteins, fusion ====
- MeSH D12.776.624.664.500.100 – fusion proteins, bcr-abl
- MeSH D12.776.624.664.500.320 – fusion proteins, gag-onc
- MeSH D12.776.624.664.500.320.700 – oncogene protein p65(gag-jun)
- MeSH D12.776.624.664.500.660 – oncogene protein tpr-met

==== MeSH D12.776.624.664.520 – oncogene proteins, viral ====
- MeSH D12.776.624.664.520.045 – adenovirus early proteins
- MeSH D12.776.624.664.520.045.050 – adenovirus E1 proteins
- MeSH D12.776.624.664.520.045.050.100 – adenovirus E1A proteins
- MeSH D12.776.624.664.520.045.050.110 – adenovirus E1B proteins
- MeSH D12.776.624.664.520.045.060 – adenovirus e2 proteins
- MeSH D12.776.624.664.520.045.070 – adenovirus e3 proteins
- MeSH D12.776.624.664.520.045.080 – adenovirus e4 proteins
- MeSH D12.776.624.664.520.090 – antigens, polyomavirus transforming
- MeSH D12.776.624.664.520.420 – papillomavirus e7 proteins
- MeSH D12.776.624.664.520.750 – retroviridae proteins, oncogenic
- MeSH D12.776.624.664.520.750.320 – fusion proteins, gag-onc
- MeSH D12.776.624.664.520.750.320.700 – oncogene protein p65(gag-jun)
- MeSH D12.776.624.664.520.750.470 – gene products, rex
- MeSH D12.776.624.664.520.750.480 – gene products, tax
- MeSH D12.776.624.664.520.750.650 – oncogene protein gp140(v-fms)
- MeSH D12.776.624.664.520.750.710 – oncogene protein p21(ras)
- MeSH D12.776.624.664.520.750.750 – oncogene protein p55(v-myc)
- MeSH D12.776.624.664.520.750.760 – oncogene protein pp60(v-src)
- MeSH D12.776.624.664.520.750.788 – oncogene protein v-akt
- MeSH D12.776.624.664.520.750.817 – oncogene protein v-cbl
- MeSH D12.776.624.664.520.750.846 – oncogene protein v-crk
- MeSH D12.776.624.664.520.750.860 – oncogene protein v-maf
- MeSH D12.776.624.664.520.750.875 – oncogene proteins v-abl
- MeSH D12.776.624.664.520.750.882 – oncogene proteins v-erba
- MeSH D12.776.624.664.520.750.883 – oncogene proteins v-erbb
- MeSH D12.776.624.664.520.750.887 – oncogene proteins v-fos
- MeSH D12.776.624.664.520.750.900 – oncogene proteins v-mos
- MeSH D12.776.624.664.520.750.903 – oncogene proteins v-myb
- MeSH D12.776.624.664.520.750.920 – oncogene proteins v-raf
- MeSH D12.776.624.664.520.750.925 – oncogene proteins v-rel
- MeSH D12.776.624.664.520.750.935 – oncogene proteins v-sis

==== MeSH D12.776.624.664.700 – proto-oncogene proteins ====
- MeSH D12.776.624.664.700.100 – cyclin d1
- MeSH D12.776.624.664.700.110 – fibroblast growth factor 4
- MeSH D12.776.624.664.700.112 – fibroblast growth factor 6
- MeSH D12.776.624.664.700.114 – fms-like tyrosine kinase 3
- MeSH D12.776.624.664.700.120 – receptor, fibroblast growth factor, type 3
- MeSH D12.776.624.664.700.130 – muts homolog 2 protein
- MeSH D12.776.624.664.700.148 – myeloid-lymphoid leukemia protein
- MeSH D12.776.624.664.700.167 – proto-oncogene proteins c-abl
- MeSH D12.776.624.664.700.168 – proto-oncogene proteins c-akt
- MeSH D12.776.624.664.700.169 – proto-oncogene proteins c-bcl-2
- MeSH D12.776.624.664.700.170 – proto-oncogene proteins c-bcl-6
- MeSH D12.776.624.664.700.171 – proto-oncogene proteins c-bcr
- MeSH D12.776.624.664.700.172 – proto-oncogene proteins c-cbl
- MeSH D12.776.624.664.700.174 – proto-oncogene proteins c-crk
- MeSH D12.776.624.664.700.175 – proto-oncogene proteins c-ets
- MeSH D12.776.624.664.700.175.100 – proto-oncogene protein c-ets-1
- MeSH D12.776.624.664.700.175.200 – proto-oncogene protein c-ets-2
- MeSH D12.776.624.664.700.175.400 – proto-oncogene protein c-fli-1
- MeSH D12.776.624.664.700.175.600 – ternary complex factors
- MeSH D12.776.624.664.700.175.600.100 – ets-domain protein elk-1
- MeSH D12.776.624.664.700.175.600.300 – ets-domain protein elk-4
- MeSH D12.776.624.664.700.177 – proto-oncogene proteins c-fes
- MeSH D12.776.624.664.700.179 – proto-oncogene proteins c-fos
- MeSH D12.776.624.664.700.180 – proto-oncogene proteins c-fyn
- MeSH D12.776.624.664.700.181 – proto-oncogene proteins c-hck
- MeSH D12.776.624.664.700.182 – proto-oncogene proteins c-jun
- MeSH D12.776.624.664.700.183 – proto-oncogene proteins c-kit
- MeSH D12.776.624.664.700.184 – proto-oncogene proteins c-maf
- MeSH D12.776.624.664.700.185 – proto-oncogene proteins c-mdm2
- MeSH D12.776.624.664.700.186 – proto-oncogene proteins c-met
- MeSH D12.776.624.664.700.187 – proto-oncogene proteins c-mos
- MeSH D12.776.624.664.700.188 – proto-oncogene proteins c-myb
- MeSH D12.776.624.664.700.189 – proto-oncogene proteins c-myc
- MeSH D12.776.624.664.700.191 – proto-oncogene proteins c-pim-1
- MeSH D12.776.624.664.700.192 – proto-oncogene proteins c-rel
- MeSH D12.776.624.664.700.194 – proto-oncogene proteins c-ret
- MeSH D12.776.624.664.700.195 – proto-oncogene proteins c-sis
- MeSH D12.776.624.664.700.198 – proto-oncogene proteins c-vav
- MeSH D12.776.624.664.700.199 – proto-oncogene proteins c-yes
- MeSH D12.776.624.664.700.200 – proto-oncogene proteins p21(ras)
- MeSH D12.776.624.664.700.202 – proto-oncogene proteins pp60(c-src)
- MeSH D12.776.624.664.700.204 – raf kinases
- MeSH D12.776.624.664.700.204.200 – proto-oncogene proteins b-raf
- MeSH D12.776.624.664.700.204.500 – proto-oncogene proteins c-raf
- MeSH D12.776.624.664.700.205 – RNA-binding protein EWS
- MeSH D12.776.624.664.700.250 – lymphocyte specific protein tyrosine kinase p56(lck)
- MeSH D12.776.624.664.700.642 – receptor, erbb-2
- MeSH D12.776.624.664.700.790 – receptor, erbb-3
- MeSH D12.776.624.664.700.800 – receptor, macrophage colony-stimulating factor
- MeSH D12.776.624.664.700.830 – receptors, thyroid hormone
- MeSH D12.776.624.664.700.830.500 – thyroid hormone receptors alpha
- MeSH D12.776.624.664.700.830.750 – thyroid hormone receptors beta
- MeSH D12.776.624.664.700.915 – RNA-binding protein FUS
- MeSH D12.776.624.664.700.957 – stathmin
- MeSH D12.776.624.664.700.967 – wnt1 protein
- MeSH D12.776.624.664.700.978 – wnt2 protein

=== MeSH D12.776.624.776 – tumor suppressor proteins ===
==== MeSH D12.776.624.776.355 – cyclin-dependent kinase inhibitor proteins ====
- MeSH D12.776.624.776.355.100 – cyclin-dependent kinase inhibitor p15
- MeSH D12.776.624.776.355.200 – cyclin-dependent kinase inhibitor p16
- MeSH D12.776.624.776.355.300 – cyclin-dependent kinase inhibitor p18
- MeSH D12.776.624.776.355.400 – cyclin-dependent kinase inhibitor p19
- MeSH D12.776.624.776.355.500 – cyclin-dependent kinase inhibitor p21
- MeSH D12.776.624.776.355.600 – cyclin-dependent kinase inhibitor p27
- MeSH D12.776.624.776.355.700 – cyclin-dependent kinase inhibitor p57

== MeSH D12.776.641 – nerve tissue proteins ==
See List of MeSH codes (D12.776.641).

== MeSH D12.776.660 – nuclear proteins ==
See List of MeSH codes (D12.776.660).

== MeSH D12.776.664 – nucleoproteins ==
=== MeSH D12.776.664.235 – chromosomal proteins, non-histone ===
==== MeSH D12.776.664.235.400 – high mobility group proteins ====
- MeSH D12.776.664.235.400.400 – hmgn proteins
- MeSH D12.776.664.235.400.400.200 – hmgn1 protein
- MeSH D12.776.664.235.400.400.300 – hmgn2 protein
- MeSH D12.776.664.235.400.500 – hmga proteins
- MeSH D12.776.664.235.400.500.100 – hmga1a protein
- MeSH D12.776.664.235.400.500.200 – hmga1b protein
- MeSH D12.776.664.235.400.500.300 – hmga1c protein
- MeSH D12.776.664.235.400.500.600 – hmga2 protein
- MeSH D12.776.664.235.400.600 – hmgb proteins
- MeSH D12.776.664.235.400.600.300 – hmgb1 protein
- MeSH D12.776.664.235.400.600.600 – hmgb2 protein
- MeSH D12.776.664.235.400.600.800 – hmgb3 protein
- MeSH D12.776.664.235.400.700 – sex-determining region y protein
- MeSH D12.776.664.235.400.800 – tcf transcription factors
- MeSH D12.776.664.235.400.800.500 – lymphoid enhancer-binding factor 1
- MeSH D12.776.664.235.400.800.750 – t cell transcription factor 1

=== MeSH D12.776.664.962 – RNA-binding proteins ===
==== MeSH D12.776.664.962.444 – mrna cleavage and polyadenylation factors ====
- MeSH D12.776.664.962.444.240 – cleavage and polyadenylation specificity factor
- MeSH D12.776.664.962.444.249 – cleavage stimulation factor

==== MeSH D12.776.664.962.452 – poly(a)-binding proteins ====
- MeSH D12.776.664.962.452.249 – poly(a)-binding protein i
- MeSH D12.776.664.962.452.500 – poly(a)-binding protein ii

==== MeSH D12.776.664.962.500 – ribonucleoproteins ====
- MeSH D12.776.664.962.500.500 – heterogeneous-nuclear ribonucleoproteins
- MeSH D12.776.664.962.500.500.061 – RNA-binding protein FUS
- MeSH D12.776.664.962.500.500.100 – heterogeneous-nuclear ribonucleoprotein group a-b
- MeSH D12.776.664.962.500.500.200 – heterogeneous-nuclear ribonucleoprotein group c
- MeSH D12.776.664.962.500.500.300 – heterogeneous-nuclear ribonucleoprotein d
- MeSH D12.776.664.962.500.500.400 – heterogeneous-nuclear ribonucleoprotein group f-h
- MeSH D12.776.664.962.500.500.500 – heterogeneous-nuclear ribonucleoprotein k
- MeSH D12.776.664.962.500.500.600 – heterogeneous-nuclear ribonucleoprotein l
- MeSH D12.776.664.962.500.500.700 – heterogeneous-nuclear ribonucleoprotein group m
- MeSH D12.776.664.962.500.500.800 – heterogeneous-nuclear ribonucleoprotein u
- MeSH D12.776.664.962.500.500.900 – RNA-binding protein EWS
- MeSH D12.776.664.962.500.625 – ribonuclease p
- MeSH D12.776.664.962.500.750 – ribonucleoproteins, small cytoplasmic
- MeSH D12.776.664.962.500.750.800 – signal recognition particle
- MeSH D12.776.664.962.500.875 – ribonucleoproteins, small nuclear
- MeSH D12.776.664.962.500.875.590 – ribonucleoproteins, small nucleolar
- MeSH D12.776.664.962.500.875.600 – ribonucleoprotein, u1 small nuclear
- MeSH D12.776.664.962.500.875.605 – ribonucleoprotein, u2 small nuclear
- MeSH D12.776.664.962.500.875.615 – ribonucleoprotein, u4-u6 small nuclear
- MeSH D12.776.664.962.500.875.620 – ribonucleoprotein, u5 small nuclear
- MeSH D12.776.664.962.500.875.625 – ribonucleoprotein, u7 small nuclear
- MeSH D12.776.664.962.500.906 – RNA-induced silencing complex
- MeSH D12.776.664.962.500.937 – vault ribonucleoprotein particles

==== MeSH D12.776.664.962.750 – rna cap-binding proteins ====
- MeSH D12.776.664.962.750.374 – eukaryotic initiation factor-4f
- MeSH D12.776.664.962.750.750 – nuclear cap-binding protein complex

== MeSH D12.776.765 – plant proteins ==
=== MeSH D12.776.765.678 – plant lectins ===
==== MeSH D12.776.765.678.968 – wheat germ agglutinins ====
- MeSH D12.776.765.678.968.900 – wheat germ agglutinin-horseradish peroxidase conjugate

== MeSH D12.776.826 – receptors, cytoplasmic and nuclear ==
=== MeSH D12.776.826.701 – receptors, retinoic acid ===
==== MeSH D12.776.826.701.500 – Retinoid X receptors ====
- MeSH D12.776.826.701.500.500 – Retinoid X receptor alpha
- MeSH D12.776.826.701.500.625 – Retinoid X receptor beta
- MeSH D12.776.826.701.500.750 – Retinoid X receptor gamma

=== MeSH D12.776.826.750 – receptors, steroid ===
==== MeSH D12.776.826.750.074 – coup transcription factors ====
- MeSH D12.776.826.750.074.249 – coup transcription factor i
- MeSH D12.776.826.750.074.500 – coup transcription factor ii

==== MeSH D12.776.826.750.350 – receptors, estrogen ====
- MeSH D12.776.826.750.350.174 – estrogen receptor alpha
- MeSH D12.776.826.750.350.262 – estrogen receptor beta
- MeSH D12.776.826.750.350.350 – receptors, estradiol

==== MeSH D12.776.826.750.530 – receptors, mineralocorticoid ====
- MeSH D12.776.826.750.530.150 – receptors, aldosterone

== MeSH D12.776.827 – receptors, drug ==
=== MeSH D12.776.827.275 – immunophilins ===
==== MeSH D12.776.827.275.700 – tacrolimus binding proteins ====
- MeSH D12.776.827.275.700.500 – tacrolimus binding protein 1a

== MeSH D12.776.828 – recombinant proteins ==
=== MeSH D12.776.828.075 – colony-stimulating factors, recombinant ===
==== MeSH D12.776.828.075.350 – granulocyte colony stimulating factor, recombinant ====
- MeSH D12.776.828.075.350.275 – filgrastim

== MeSH D12.776.835 – ribosomal proteins ==
=== MeSH D12.776.835.700 – peptide elongation factors ===
==== MeSH D12.776.835.700.350 – gtp phosphohydrolase-linked elongation factors ====
- MeSH D12.776.835.700.350.200 – peptide elongation factor g
- MeSH D12.776.835.700.350.700 – peptide elongation factor tu
- MeSH D12.776.835.700.350.800 – peptide elongation factor 1
- MeSH D12.776.835.700.350.850 – peptide elongation factor 2

=== MeSH D12.776.835.725 – peptide initiation factors ===
==== MeSH D12.776.835.725.868 – eukaryotic initiation factors ====
- MeSH D12.776.835.725.868.124 – eukaryotic initiation factor-1
- MeSH D12.776.835.725.868.249 – eukaryotic initiation factor-2
- MeSH D12.776.835.725.868.374 – eukaryotic initiation factor-2b
- MeSH D12.776.835.725.868.437 – eukaryotic initiation factor 3
- MeSH D12.776.835.725.868.500 – eukaryotic initiation factor-4f
- MeSH D12.776.835.725.868.500.500 – eukaryotic initiation factor-4a
- MeSH D12.776.835.725.868.500.750 – eukaryotic initiation factor-4e
- MeSH D12.776.835.725.868.500.875 – Eukaryotic initiation factor 4G
- MeSH D12.776.835.725.868.750 – eukaryotic initiation factor-5

==== MeSH D12.776.835.725.934 – prokaryotic initiation factors ====
- MeSH D12.776.835.725.934.374 – prokaryotic initiation factor-1
- MeSH D12.776.835.725.934.562 – prokaryotic initiation factor-2
- MeSH D12.776.835.725.934.750 – prokaryotic initiation factor-3

== MeSH D12.776.850 – salivary proteins ==
(no MeSHNumber) LAPP (leech anti-platelet protein) - presently redirects to LAMP (software bundle) where the term is not mentioned

== MeSH D12.776.860 – scleroproteins ==
=== MeSH D12.776.860.300 – extracellular matrix proteins ===
==== MeSH D12.776.860.300.250 – collagen ====
- MeSH D12.776.860.300.250.300 – fibrillar collagens
- MeSH D12.776.860.300.250.300.100 – Type I collagen
- MeSH D12.776.860.300.250.300.200 – Type II collagen
- MeSH D12.776.860.300.250.300.300 – Type III collagen
- MeSH D12.776.860.300.250.300.400 – Type V collagen
- MeSH D12.776.860.300.250.300.500 – Type XI collagen
- MeSH D12.776.860.300.250.400 – non-fibrillar collagens
- MeSH D12.776.860.300.250.400.100 – Type IV collagen
- MeSH D12.776.860.300.250.400.200 – Type VI collagen
- MeSH D12.776.860.300.250.400.300 – Type VII collagen
- MeSH D12.776.860.300.250.400.400 – Type VIII collagen
- MeSH D12.776.860.300.250.400.500 – Type X collagen
- MeSH D12.776.860.300.250.400.525 – Type XIII collagen
- MeSH D12.776.860.300.250.400.537 – Type XVIII collagen
- MeSH D12.776.860.300.250.400.537.500 – endostatins
- MeSH D12.776.860.300.250.400.550 – fibril-associated collagens
- MeSH D12.776.860.300.250.400.550.200 – Type IX collagen
- MeSH D12.776.860.300.250.400.550.300 – Type XII collagen
- MeSH D12.776.860.300.250.600 – procollagen
- MeSH D12.776.860.300.250.700 – tropocollagen

==== MeSH D12.776.860.300.350 – elastin ====
- MeSH D12.776.860.300.350.700 – tropoelastin

== MeSH D12.776.930 – transcription factors ==
See List of MeSH codes (D12.776.930).

== MeSH D12.776.964 – viral proteins ==
=== MeSH D12.776.964.700 – oncogene proteins, viral ===
==== MeSH D12.776.964.700.045 – adenovirus early proteins ====
- MeSH D12.776.964.700.045.050 – adenovirus e1 proteins
- MeSH D12.776.964.700.045.050.100 – adenovirus e1a proteins
- MeSH D12.776.964.700.045.050.110 – adenovirus e1b proteins
- MeSH D12.776.964.700.045.060 – adenovirus e2 proteins
- MeSH D12.776.964.700.045.070 – adenovirus e3 proteins
- MeSH D12.776.964.700.045.080 – adenovirus e4 proteins

==== MeSH D12.776.964.700.750 – retroviridae proteins, oncogenic ====
- MeSH D12.776.964.700.750.320 – fusion proteins, gag-onc
- MeSH D12.776.964.700.750.320.700 – oncogene protein p65(gag-jun)
- MeSH D12.776.964.700.750.470 – gene products, rex
- MeSH D12.776.964.700.750.480 – gene products, tax (gene)
- MeSH D12.776.964.700.750.650 – oncogene protein gp140(v-fms)
- MeSH D12.776.964.700.750.710 – oncogene protein p21(ras)
- MeSH D12.776.964.700.750.750 – oncogene protein p55(v-myc)
- MeSH D12.776.964.700.750.760 – oncogene protein pp60(v-src)
- MeSH D12.776.964.700.750.817 – oncogene protein v-maf
- MeSH D12.776.964.700.750.875 – oncogene proteins v-abl
- MeSH D12.776.964.700.750.882 – oncogene proteins v-erba
- MeSH D12.776.964.700.750.883 – oncogene proteins v-erbb
- MeSH D12.776.964.700.750.887 – oncogene proteins v-fos
- MeSH D12.776.964.700.750.900 – oncogene proteins v-mos
- MeSH D12.776.964.700.750.903 – oncogene proteins v-myb
- MeSH D12.776.964.700.750.920 – oncogene proteins v-raf
- MeSH D12.776.964.700.750.925 – oncogene proteins v-rel
- MeSH D12.776.964.700.750.935 – oncogene proteins v-sis

=== MeSH D12.776.964.775 – retroviridae proteins ===
==== MeSH D12.776.964.775.325 – gene products, env (gene) ====
- MeSH D12.776.964.775.325.330 – hiv envelope protein gp41
- MeSH D12.776.964.775.325.350 – hiv envelope protein gp120
- MeSH D12.776.964.775.325.380 – hiv envelope protein gp160

==== MeSH D12.776.964.775.350 – gene products, gag (gene) ====
- MeSH D12.776.964.775.350.320 – fusion proteins, gag-onc
- MeSH D12.776.964.775.350.320.700 – oncogene protein p65(gag-jun)
- MeSH D12.776.964.775.350.325 – fusion proteins, gag-pol
- MeSH D12.776.964.775.350.400 – hiv core protein p24

==== MeSH D12.776.964.775.375 – gene products, pol (gene) ====
- MeSH D12.776.964.775.375.325 – fusion proteins, gag-pol
- MeSH D12.776.964.775.375.335 – hiv integrase
- MeSH D12.776.964.775.375.340 – HIV protease
- MeSH D12.776.964.775.375.750 – RNA-directed DNA polymerase
- MeSH D12.776.964.775.375.750.375 – hiv-1 reverse transcriptase

==== MeSH D12.776.964.775.750 – retroviridae proteins, oncogenic ====
- MeSH D12.776.964.775.750.320 – fusion proteins, gag-onc
- MeSH D12.776.964.775.750.320.700 – oncogene protein p65(gag-jun)
- MeSH D12.776.964.775.750.470 – gene products, rex
- MeSH D12.776.964.775.750.480 – gene products, tax
- MeSH D12.776.964.775.750.650 – oncogene protein gp140(v-fms)
- MeSH D12.776.964.775.750.710 – oncogene protein p21(ras)
- MeSH D12.776.964.775.750.750 – oncogene protein p55(v-myc)
- MeSH D12.776.964.775.750.760 – oncogene protein pp60(v-src)
- MeSH D12.776.964.775.750.817 – oncogene protein v-maf
- MeSH D12.776.964.775.750.875 – oncogene proteins v-abl
- MeSH D12.776.964.775.750.882 – oncogene proteins v-erba
- MeSH D12.776.964.775.750.883 – oncogene proteins v-erbb
- MeSH D12.776.964.775.750.887 – oncogene proteins v-fos
- MeSH D12.776.964.775.750.900 – oncogene proteins v-mos
- MeSH D12.776.964.775.750.903 – oncogene proteins v-myb
- MeSH D12.776.964.775.750.920 – oncogene proteins v-raf
- MeSH D12.776.964.775.750.925 – oncogene proteins v-rel
- MeSH D12.776.964.775.750.935 – oncogene proteins v-sis

=== MeSH D12.776.964.950 – viral regulatory proteins ===
==== MeSH D12.776.964.950.800 – trans-activators ====
- MeSH D12.776.964.950.800.385 – gene products, rev (HIV)
- MeSH D12.776.964.950.800.400 – gene products, tat
- MeSH D12.776.964.950.800.410 – gene products, tax
- MeSH D12.776.964.950.800.430 – gene products, vpr
- MeSH D12.776.964.950.800.445 – herpes simplex virus protein vmw65

=== MeSH D12.776.964.970 – viral structural proteins ===
==== MeSH D12.776.964.970.600 – nucleocapsid proteins ====
- MeSH D12.776.964.970.600.550 – capsid proteins
- MeSH D12.776.964.970.600.850 – viral core proteins
- MeSH D12.776.964.970.600.850.350 – gene products, gag
- MeSH D12.776.964.970.600.850.350.325 – fusion proteins, gag-pol
- MeSH D12.776.964.970.600.850.350.400 – hiv core protein p24
- MeSH D12.776.964.970.600.850.375 – gene products, pol (gene)
- MeSH D12.776.964.970.600.850.375.325 – fusion proteins, gag-pol
- MeSH D12.776.964.970.600.850.375.335 – hiv integrase
- MeSH D12.776.964.970.600.850.375.340 – HIV protease
- MeSH D12.776.964.970.600.850.375.750 – RNA-directed DNA polymerase
- MeSH D12.776.964.970.600.850.375.750.375 – hiv-1 reverse transcriptase

==== MeSH D12.776.964.970.880 – viral envelope proteins ====
- MeSH D12.776.964.970.880.325 – gene products, env
- MeSH D12.776.964.970.880.325.330 – hiv envelope protein gp41
- MeSH D12.776.964.970.880.325.350 – hiv envelope protein gp120
- MeSH D12.776.964.970.880.325.380 – hiv envelope protein gp160
- MeSH D12.776.964.970.880.345 – hemagglutinins, viral
- MeSH D12.776.964.970.880.345.500 – hemagglutinin glycoproteins, influenza virus
- MeSH D12.776.964.970.880.350 – hn protein
- MeSH D12.776.964.970.880.910 – viral fusion proteins
- MeSH D12.776.964.970.880.910.330 – hiv envelope protein gp41
- MeSH D12.776.964.970.880.940 – viral matrix proteins
- MeSH D12.776.964.970.880.940.580 – gene products, vpu

==== MeSH D12.776.964.970.910 – viral tail proteins ====
The list continues at List of MeSH codes (D13).
