= Assimilatory nitrate reductase =

Assimilatory nitrate reductase may refer to:

- Nitrate reductase (NADH)
- Nitrate reductase (NAD(P)H)
- Nitrate reductase (NADPH)
- Nitrite reductase
