= Viral pathogenesis =

Study of how viruses cause diseases

Viral pathogenesis is the study of the process and mechanisms by which viruses cause diseases in their target hosts, often at the cellular or molecular level. It is a specialized field of study in virology.

Pathogenesis is a qualitative description of the process by which an initial infection causes disease. Viral disease is the sum of the effects of viral replication on the host and the host's subsequent immune response against the virus. Viruses are able to initiate infection, disperse throughout the body, and replicate due to specific virulence factors.

There are several factors that affect pathogenesis. Some of these factors include virulence characteristics of the virus that is infecting. In order to cause disease, the virus must also overcome several inhibitory effects present in the host. Some of the inhibitory effects include distance, physical barriers and host defenses. These inhibitory effects may differ among individuals due to the inhibitory effects being genetically controlled.

Viral pathogenesis is affected by various factors: (1) transmission, entry and spread within the host, (2) tropism, (3) virus virulence and disease mechanisms, (4) host factors and host defense.

== Mechanisms of infection ==
Viruses need to establish infections in host cells in order to multiply. For infections to occur, the virus has to hijack host factors and evade the host immune response for efficient replication. Viral replication frequently requires complex interactions between the virus and host factors that may result in deleterious effects in the host, which confers the virus its pathogenicity.

=== Important steps of a virus life cycle that shape pathogenesis ===
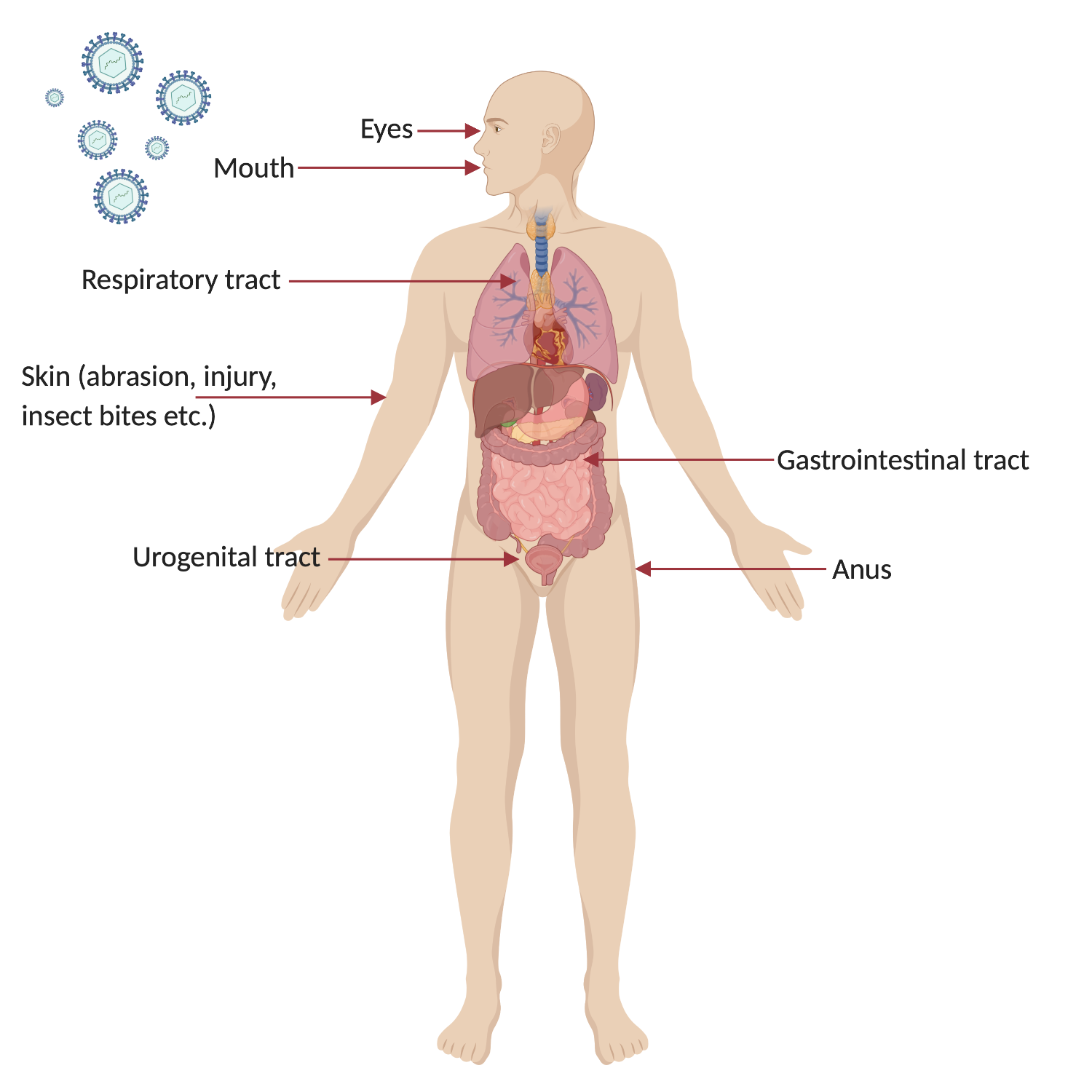
Typical sites of virus entry into the body: The first steps of viral infection is determined by the site at which the virus implants into the body. This would subsequently dictate the mechanisms of viral pathogenesis.

- Transmission from a host with an infection to a second host
- Entry of the virus into the body
- Local replication in susceptible cells
- Dissemination and spread to secondary tissues and target organs
- Secondary replication in susceptible cells
- Shedding of the virus into the environment
- Onward transmission to third host

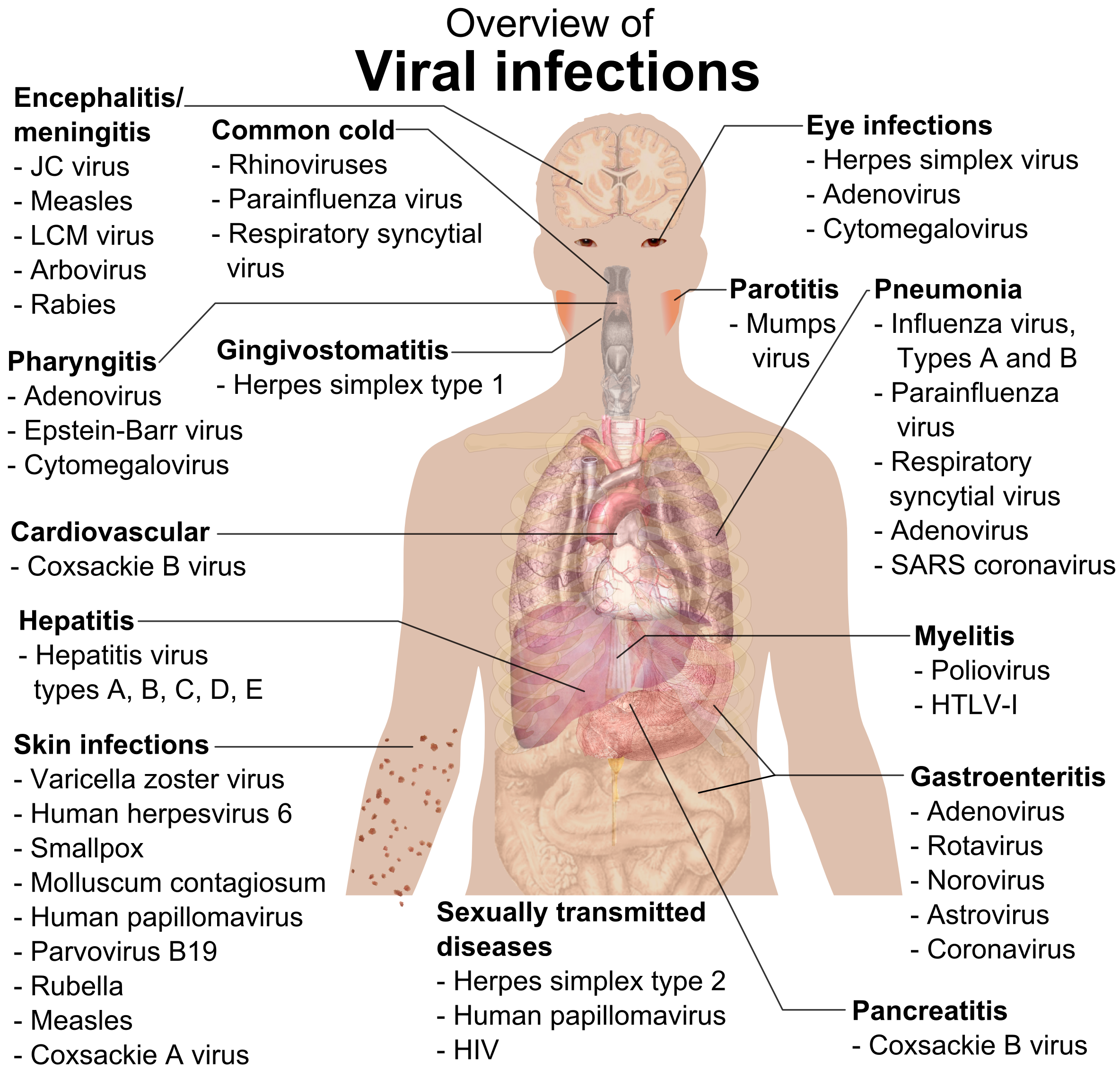
Overview of the main manifestations of viral infection

=== Primary transmission ===
Three requirements must be satisfied to ensure successful infection of a host. Firstly, there must be sufficient quantity of virus available to initiate infection. Cells at the site of infection must be accessible, in that their cell membranes display host-encoded receptors that the virus can exploit for entry into the cell, and the host anti-viral defense systems must be ineffective or absent.

=== Entry to host ===
Viruses causing disease in humans often enter through the mouth, nose, genital tract, or through damaged areas of skin, so cells of the respiratory, gastrointestinal, skin and genital tissues are often the primary site of infection. Some viruses are capable of transmission to a mammalian fetus through infected germ cells at the time of fertilization, later in pregnancy via the placenta, and by infection at birth.

=== Local replication and spread ===
Following initial entry to the host, the virus hijacks the host cell machinery to undergo viral amplification. Here, the virus must modulate the host innate immune response to prevent its elimination by the body while facilitating its replication. Replicated virus from the initially infected cell then disperse to infect neighbouring susceptible cells, possibly with spread to different cell types like leukocytes. This results in a localised infection, in which the virus mainly spreads and infects adjacent cells to the site of entry. Otherwise, the virus can be released into extracellular fluids. Examples of localised infections include: common cold (rhinovirus), flu (parainfluenza), gastrointestinal infections (rotavirus) or skin infections (papillomavirus).

=== Dissemination and secondary replication ===
In other cases, the virus can cause systemic disease through a disseminated infection spread throughout the body. The predominant mode of viral dissemination occurs through the blood or lymphatic system, some of which include viruses responsible for chickenpox (varicella zoster virus), smallpox (variola), HIV (human immunodeficiency virus). A minority of viruses can disseminate via the nervous system. Notably, the poliovirus can be transmitted via the fecal-oral route, where it initially replicates in its site of entry, the small intestine and spread to regional lymph nodes. Then, the virus disseminates via the bloodstream into different organs in the body (e.g. liver, spleen), followed by a secondary round of replication and dissemination into the central nervous system to damage motor neurons.

=== Shedding and secondary transmission ===
Finally, the viruses spread to sites where shedding into the environment can occur. The respiratory, alimentary and urogenital tracts and the blood are the most frequent sites of shedding in the form of bodily fluids, aerosols, skin, excrement. The virus would then go on to be transmitted to another person, and establish the infection cycle all over again.

== Factors affecting pathogenesis ==
There are a few main overarching factors affecting viral diseases:

- Virus tropism
- Virus factors
- Host factors

=== Molecular basis of virus tropism ===
Virus tropism refers to the virus' preferential site of replication in discrete cell types within an organ. In most cases, tropism is determined by the ability of the viral surface proteins to fuse or bind to surface receptors of specific target cells to establish infection. Thus, the binding specificity of viral surface proteins dictates tropism as well as the destruction of particular cell populations, and is therefore a major determinant of virus pathogenesis. However, co-receptors are sometimes required in addition to the binding of cellular receptors on host cells to viral proteins in order to establish infection. For instance, HIV-1 requires target cells to express co-receptors CCR5 or CXCR4, on top of the CD4 receptor for productive viral attachment. Interestingly, HIV-1 can undergo a tropism switch, where the virus glycoprotein gp120 initially uses CCR5 (mainly on macrophages) as the primary co-receptor for entering the host cell. Subsequently, HIV-1 switches to bind to CXCR4 (mainly on T cells) as the infection progresses, in doing so transitions the viral pathogenicity to a different stage.

Apart from cellular receptors, viral tropism can also governed by other intracellular factors, such as tissue-specific transcription factors. An example would be the JC polyomavirus, in which its tropism is limited to glial cells since its enhancer is only active in glial cells, and JC viral gene expression requires host transcription factors expressed exclusively in glial cells.

The accessibility of host tissues and organs to the virus also regulates tropism. Accessibility is affected by physical barriers, such as in enteroviruses, which replicate in the intestine since they are able to withstand bile, digestive enzymes and acidic environments.

=== Virus factors ===
Viral genetics encoding viral factors will determine the degree of viral pathogenesis. This can be measured as virulence, which can be used to compare the quantitative degree of pathology between related viruses. In other words, different virus strains possessing different virus factors can lead to different degrees of virulence, which in turn can be exploited to study the differences in pathogenesis of viral variants with different virulence.

Virus factors are largely influenced by viral genetics, which is the virulence determinant of structural or non-structural proteins and non-coding sequences. For a virus to successfully infect and cause disease in the host, it has to encode specific virus factors in its genome to overcome the preventive effects of physical barriers, and modulate host inhibition of virus replication. In the case of poliovirus, all vaccine strains found in the oral polio vaccine contain attenuating point mutations in the 5' untranslated region (5' UTR). Conversely, the virulent strain responsible for causing polio disease does not contain these 5' UTR point mutations and thus display greater viral pathogenicity in hosts.

Virus factors encoded in the genome often control the tropism, routes of virus entry, shedding and transmission. In polioviruses, the attenuating point mutations are thought to induce a replication and translation defect to reduce the virus' ability of cross-linking to host cells and replicate within the nervous system.

Viruses have also developed a variety of immunomodulation mechanisms to subvert the host immune response. This tend to feature virus-encoded decoy receptors that target cytokines and chemokines produced as part of the host immune response, or homologues of host cytokines. As such, viruses capable of manipulating the host cell response to infection as an immune evasion strategy exhibit greater pathogenicity.

=== Host factors ===
Viral pathogenesis is also largely dependent on host factors. Several viral infections have displayed a variety of effects, ranging from asymptomatic to symptomatic or even critical infection, solely based on differing host factors alone. In particular, genetic factors, age and immunocompetence play an important role is dictating whether the viral infection can be modulated by the host. Mice that possess functional Mx genes encode an Mx1 protein which can selectively inhibit influenza replication. Therefore, mice carrying a non-functional Mx allele fail to synthesise the Mx protein and are more susceptible to influenza infection. Alternatively, immunocompromised individuals due to existing illnesses may have a defective immune system which makes them more vulnerable to damage by the virus. Furthermore, a number of viruses display variable pathogenicity depending on the age of the host. Mumps, polio, and Epstein-Barr virus cause more severe disease in adults, while others like rotavirus cause more severe infection in infants. It is therefore hypothesized that the host immune system and defense mechanisms might differ with age.

== Disease mechanisms: How do viral infections cause disease? ==
A viral infection does not always cause disease. A viral infection simply involves viral replication in the host, but disease is the damage caused by viral multiplication. An individual who has a viral infection but does not display disease symptoms is known as a carrier.

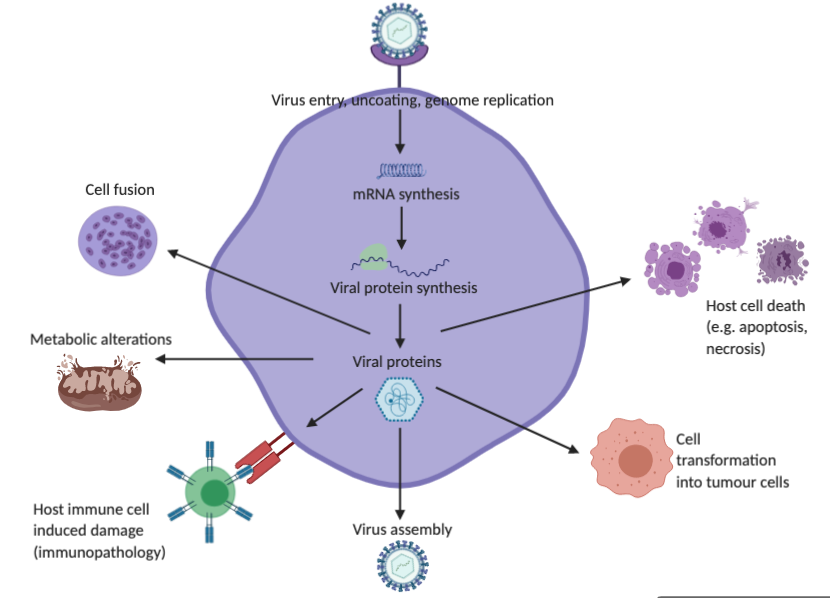
Mechanisms by which viruses cause damage and disease to host cells

=== Damage caused by the virus ===
Once inside host cells, viruses can destroy cells through a variety of mechanisms. Viruses often induce direct cytopathic effects to disrupt cellular functions. This could be through releasing enzymes to degrade host metabolic precursors, or releasing proteins that inhibit the synthesis of important host factors, proteins, DNA and/or RNA. Namely, viral proteins of herpes simplex virus can degrade host DNA and inhibit host cell DNA replication and mRNA transcription. Poliovirus can inactivate proteins involved in host mRNA translation without affecting poliovirus mRNA translation. In some cases, expression of viral fusion proteins on the surface of the host cells can cause host cell fusion to form multinucleated cells. Notable examples include measles virus, HIV, respiratory syncytial virus.

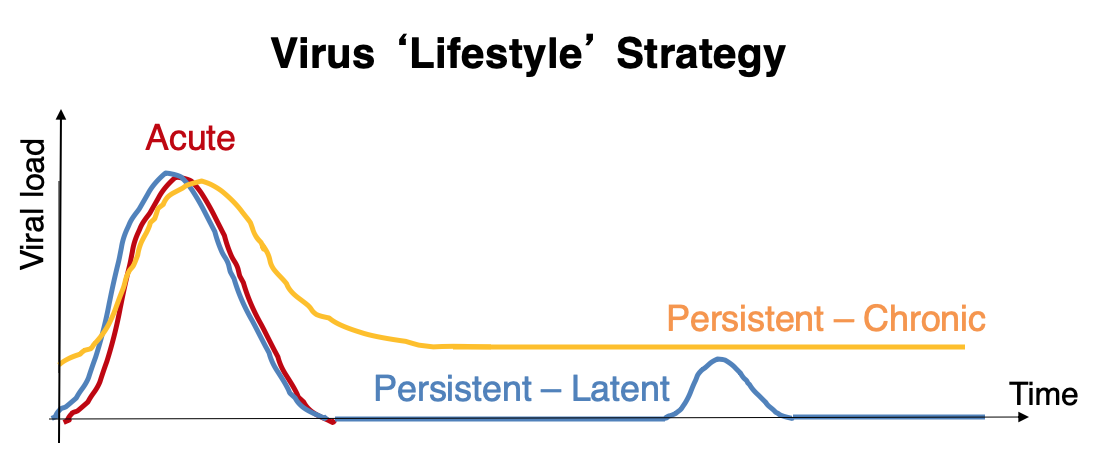
The "lifestyle" strategies of viruses in host cells. Acute infections tend to occur for a relatively short duration, while persistent infections are when the virus is not completely cleared from the body. In latent infections, reactivation of disease may occur a long time after the initial infection.

Importantly, viral infections can differ by the "lifestyle strategy". Persistent infections happen when cells continue to survive despite a viral infection and can be further classified into latent (only the viral genome is present, there is no replication occurring) and chronic (basal levels of viral replication without stimulating an immune response). In acute infections, lytic viruses are shed at high titres for rapid infection to a secondary tissue/host, whereas persistent viruses undergo shedding at lower titres for a longer duration of transmission (months to years).

Lytic viruses are capable of destroying host cells by incurring and/or interfering with the specialised functions of host cells. An example would be the triggering of necrosis in host cells infected with the virus. Otherwise, signatures of viral infection, like the binding of HIV to co-receptors CCR5 or CXCR4, can also trigger cell death via apoptosis through host signalling cascades by immune cells. However, many viruses encode proteins that can modulate apoptosis depending on whether the infection is acute or persistent. Induction of apoptosis, such as through interaction with caspases, will promote viral shedding for lytic viruses to facilitate transmission, while viral inhibition of apoptosis could prolong the production of virus in cells, or allow the virus to remain hidden from the immune system in chronic, persistent infections. Nevertheless, induction of apoptosis in major immune cells or antigen-presenting cells may also act as a mechanism of immunosuppression in persistent infections like HIV. The primary cause of immunosuppression in HIV patients is due to the depletion of CD4+ T helper cells.

Interestingly, adenovirus has an E1A protein to induce apoptosis by initiating the cell cycle, and an E1B protein to block the apoptotic pathway through inhibition of caspase interaction.

Persistent viruses can sometimes transform host cells into cancer cells. Viruses such as the human papillomavirus (HPV), human T-lymphotropic virus (HTLV) etc., can stimulate growth of tumours in infected hosts, either by disrupting tumour suppressor gene expression (HPV) or upregulating proto-oncogene expression (HTLV).

=== Damage caused by host immune system ===
Sometimes, instead of cell death or cellular dysfunction caused by the virus, the host immune response can mediate disease and excessive inflammation. The stimulation of the innate and adaptive immune system in response to viral infections destroys infected cells, which may lead to severe pathological consequences to the host. This damage caused by the immune system is known as virus-induced immunopathology.

Specifically, immunopathology is caused by the excessive release of antibodies, interferons and pro-inflammatory cytokines, activation of the complement system, or hyperactivity of cytotoxic T cells. Secretion of interferons and other cytokines can trigger cell damage, fever and flu-like symptoms. In severe cases of certain viral infections, as in avian H5N1 influenza in 2005, aberrant induction of the host immune response can elicit a flaring release of cytokines known as a cytokine storm.

In some instances, viral infection can initiate an autoimmune response, which occurs via different proposed mechanisms: molecular mimicry and bystander mechanism. Molecular mimicry refers to an overlap in structural similarity between a viral antigen and a self-antigen. The bystander mechanism hypothesizes the initiation of a non-specific and overreactive antiviral response that tackles self-antigens in the process. Damage caused by the host itself due to autoimmunity was observed in the West Nile virus.

== Incubation period ==
Viruses display variable incubation periods upon virus entry into the host. The incubation period refers to the time taken for the onset of disease after first contact with the virus. In Rabiesvirus, the incubation period varies with the distance traversed by the virus to the target organ; but in most viruses the length of incubation depends on many factors. Surprisingly, generalised infections by togaviruses have a short incubation period due to the direct entry of the virus into target cells through insect bites.

There are several other factors that affect the incubation period. The mechanisms behind long incubation periods, months or years for example, are not completely understood yet.

== Evolution of virulence ==
Some relatively avirulent viruses in their natural host show increased virulence upon transfer to a new host species. When an emerging virus first invades a new host species, the hosts have little or no immunity against the virus and often experience high mortality. Over time, a decrease in virulence in the predominant strain can sometimes be observed. A successful pathogen needs to spread to at least one other host, and lower virulence can result in higher transmission rates under some circumstances. Likewise, genetic resistance against the virus can develop in a host population over time.

An example of the evolution of virulence in emerging virus is the case of myxomatosis in rabbits. The release of wild European rabbits in 1859 into Victoria, Australia for sport resulted in a rabbit plague. In order to curb with rabbit overpopulation, myxoma virus, a lethal species-specific poxvirus responsible for myxomatosis in rabbits, was deliberately released in South Australia in 1950. This led to a 90% decrease in rabbit populations, and the disease became endemic in a span of five years. Significantly, severely attenuated strains of the myxoma virus were detected in merely 2 years of its release, and genetic resistance in rabbits emerged within seven years.

== See also ==
- Virology
- Glossary of virology
- Pathogen
- Pathogenesis
- List of human diseases associated with infectious pathogens
