= List of MeSH codes (D12.776.260) =

The following is a partial list of the "D" codes for Medical Subject Headings (MeSH), as defined by the United States National Library of Medicine (NLM).

This list covers DNA-binding proteins. For other protein-related codes, see List of MeSH codes (D12.776).

Codes before these are found at List of MeSH codes (D12.776) § MeSH D12.776.256.920. Codes following these are found at List of MeSH codes (D12.776) § MeSH D12.776.275. For other MeSH codes, see List of MeSH codes.

The source for this content is the set of 2006 MeSH Trees from the NLM.

== MeSH D12.776.260 – dna-binding proteins ==
=== MeSH D12.776.260.103 – basic helix-loop-helix transcription factors ===
==== MeSH D12.776.260.103.500 – basic helix-loop-helix leucine zipper transcription factors ====
- MeSH D12.776.260.103.500.500 – microphthalmia-associated transcription factor
- MeSH D12.776.260.103.500.750 – sterol regulatory element binding proteins
- MeSH D12.776.260.103.500.750.500 – sterol regulatory element-binding protein 1
- MeSH D12.776.260.103.500.750.750 – sterol regulatory element-binding protein 2

==== MeSH D12.776.260.103.625 – hypoxia-inducible factor 1 ====
- MeSH D12.776.260.103.625.500 – aryl hydrocarbon receptor nuclear translocator
- MeSH D12.776.260.103.625.750 – hypoxia-inducible factor 1, alpha subunit

==== MeSH D12.776.260.103.750 – myogenic regulatory factors ====
- MeSH D12.776.260.103.750.590 – myod protein
- MeSH D12.776.260.103.750.595 – myogenic regulatory factor 5
- MeSH D12.776.260.103.750.600 – myogenin

=== MeSH D12.776.260.108 – basic-leucine zipper transcription factors ===
==== MeSH D12.776.260.108.061 – activating transcription factors ====
- MeSH D12.776.260.108.061.500 – activating transcription factor 1
- MeSH D12.776.260.108.061.750 – activating transcription factor 2
- MeSH D12.776.260.108.061.875 – activating transcription factor 3
- MeSH D12.776.260.108.061.937 – activating transcription factor 4
- MeSH D12.776.260.108.061.968 – activating transcription factor 6

==== MeSH D12.776.260.108.092 – basic helix-loop-helix leucine zipper transcription factors ====
- MeSH D12.776.260.108.092.500 – microphthalmia-associated transcription factor
- MeSH D12.776.260.108.092.750 – sterol regulatory element binding proteins
- MeSH D12.776.260.108.092.750.500 – sterol regulatory element binding protein 1
- MeSH D12.776.260.108.092.750.750 – sterol regulatory element binding protein 2

==== MeSH D12.776.260.108.124 – ccaat-enhancer-binding proteins ====
- MeSH D12.776.260.108.124.249 – ccaat-binding factor
- MeSH D12.776.260.108.124.500 – ccaat-enhancer-binding protein-alpha
- MeSH D12.776.260.108.124.750 – ccaat-enhancer-binding protein-beta
- MeSH D12.776.260.108.124.812 – ccaat-enhancer-binding protein-delta
- MeSH D12.776.260.108.124.875 – transcription factor chop
- MeSH D12.776.260.108.124.937 – Y box binding protein 1

==== MeSH D12.776.260.108.500 – maf transcription factors ====
- MeSH D12.776.260.108.500.061 – maf transcription factors, large
- MeSH D12.776.260.108.500.061.500 – mafb transcription factor
- MeSH D12.776.260.108.500.061.625 – oncogene protein v-maf
- MeSH D12.776.260.108.500.061.750 – proto-oncogene proteins c-maf
- MeSH D12.776.260.108.500.500 – maf transcription factors, small
- MeSH D12.776.260.108.500.500.249 – maff transcription factor
- MeSH D12.776.260.108.500.500.500 – mafg transcription factor
- MeSH D12.776.260.108.500.500.750 – mafk transcription factor

==== MeSH D12.776.260.108.656 – nf-e2 transcription factor ====
- MeSH D12.776.260.108.656.750 – maf transcription factors, small
- MeSH D12.776.260.108.656.750.249 – maff transcription factor
- MeSH D12.776.260.108.656.750.500 – mafg transcription factor
- MeSH D12.776.260.108.656.750.750 – mafk transcription factor
- MeSH D12.776.260.108.656.770 – nf-e2 transcription factor, p45 subunit

=== MeSH D12.776.260.235 – erythroid-specific dna-binding factors ===
==== MeSH D12.776.260.235.750 – nf-e2 transcription factor ====
- MeSH D12.776.260.235.750.750 – maf transcription factors, small
- MeSH D12.776.260.235.750.750.249 – maff transcription factor
- MeSH D12.776.260.235.750.750.500 – mafg transcription factor
- MeSH D12.776.260.235.750.750.750 – mafk transcription factor
- MeSH D12.776.260.235.750.770 – nf-e2 transcription factor, p45 subunit

=== MeSH D12.776.260.262 – hepatocyte nuclear factors ===
==== MeSH D12.776.260.262.500 – hepatocyte nuclear factor 1 ====
- MeSH D12.776.260.262.500.500 – hepatocyte nuclear factor 1-alpha
- MeSH D12.776.260.262.500.750 – hepatocyte nuclear factor 1-beta

=== MeSH D12.776.260.400 – homeodomain proteins ===
==== MeSH D12.776.260.400.249 – mads domain proteins ====
- MeSH D12.776.260.400.249.249 – agamous protein, arabidopsis
- MeSH D12.776.260.400.249.374 – deficiens protein
- MeSH D12.776.260.400.249.875 – serum response factor

==== MeSH D12.776.260.400.624 – onecut transcription factors ====
- MeSH D12.776.260.400.624.500 – hepatocyte nuclear factor 6

=== MeSH D12.776.260.522 – kruppel-like transcription factors ===
==== MeSH D12.776.260.522.750 – sp transcription factors ====
- MeSH D12.776.260.522.750.249 – sp1 transcription factor
- MeSH D12.776.260.522.750.500 – sp2 transcription factor
- MeSH D12.776.260.522.750.750 – sp3 transcription factor
- MeSH D12.776.260.522.750.875 – sp4 transcription factor

=== MeSH D12.776.260.655 – pou domain factors ===
==== MeSH D12.776.260.655.500 – octamer transcription factors ====
- MeSH D12.776.260.655.500.100 – octamer transcription factor-1
- MeSH D12.776.260.655.500.200 – octamer transcription factor-2
- MeSH D12.776.260.655.500.300 – octamer transcription factor-3
- MeSH D12.776.260.655.500.600 – octamer transcription factor-6

==== MeSH D12.776.260.655.625 – transcription factor brn-3 ====
- MeSH D12.776.260.655.625.124 – transcription factor brn-3a
- MeSH D12.776.260.655.625.249 – transcription factor brn-3b
- MeSH D12.776.260.655.625.500 – transcription factor brn-3c

=== MeSH D12.776.260.665 – proto-oncogene proteins c-ets ===
==== MeSH D12.776.260.665.600 – ternary complex factors ====
- MeSH D12.776.260.665.600.100 – ets-domain protein elk-1
- MeSH D12.776.260.665.600.300 – ets-domain protein elk-4

=== MeSH D12.776.260.713 – smad proteins ===
==== MeSH D12.776.260.713.500 – smad proteins, receptor-regulated ====
- MeSH D12.776.260.713.500.100 – smad1 protein
- MeSH D12.776.260.713.500.300 – smad3 protein
- MeSH D12.776.260.713.500.500 – smad5 protein
- MeSH D12.776.260.713.500.800 – smad8 protein

=== MeSH D12.776.260.775 – transcription factors, general ===
==== MeSH D12.776.260.775.875 – transcription factors, tfii ====
- MeSH D12.776.260.775.875.374 – transcription factor tfiia
- MeSH D12.776.260.775.875.562 – transcription factor tfiib
- MeSH D12.776.260.775.875.750 – transcription factor tfiid
- MeSH D12.776.260.775.875.750.500 – tata-box binding protein
- MeSH D12.776.260.775.875.875 – transcription factor tfiih
- MeSH D12.776.260.775.875.875.500 – xeroderma pigmentosum group d protein

==== MeSH D12.776.260.775.937 – transcription factors, tfiii ====
- MeSH D12.776.260.775.937.249 – transcription factor tfiiia
- MeSH D12.776.260.775.937.500 – transcription factor tfiiib

=== MeSH D12.776.260.900 – viral regulatory proteins ===
==== MeSH D12.776.260.900.800 – trans-activators ====
- MeSH D12.776.260.900.800.400 – herpes simplex virus protein vmw65

=== MeSH D12.776.260.950 – winged-helix transcription factors ===
==== MeSH D12.776.260.950.249 – forkhead transcription factors ====
- MeSH D12.776.260.950.249.500 – hepatocyte nuclear factor 3-alpha
- MeSH D12.776.260.950.249.750 – hepatocyte nuclear factor 3-beta
- MeSH D12.776.260.950.249.875 – hepatocyte nuclear factor 3-gamma

=== MeSH D12.776.260.975 – xeroderma pigmentosum group a protein ===
The list continues at List of MeSH codes (D12.776) § MeSH D12.776.275.
