= Vitellogenin =

Vitellinogen, open beta-sheet

Identifiers
- Symbol: DUF1943
- Pfam: PF09172
- InterPro: IPR015255
- SCOP2: 1lsh / SCOPe / SUPFAM
Available protein structures:
- PDB: IPR015255 PF09172 (ECOD; PDBsum)
- AlphaFold: IPR015255; PF09172

Vitellogenin (VTG or less popularly known as VG) (from Latin vitellus, yolk, and genero, I produce) is a precursor of the egg yolk proteins. It is synthesized and secreted by the liver of vertebrates, fat body of insects and the hepatopancreas of crustaceans. It is transported through the blood to be taken up by pinocytosis by the growing oocytes where it becomes incorporated into yolk granules. Normally, it is only found in the blood or hemolymph of females, and can therefore be used as a biomarker in vertebrates of exposure to environmental estrogens which stimulate elevated levels in males as well as females. "Vg" is a synonymous term for the vitellogenin gene and the expressed protein. The protein product is classified as a glyco-lipo-phospho-protein, having portions of sugar, fat and phosphate added post-translationally to the apo-protein in the tissue of origin. It belongs to a family of several lipid transport proteins.

Vitellogenin is an egg yolk precursor found in the females of nearly all oviparous species including fish, amphibians, reptiles, birds, most invertebrates, and monotremes. Vitellogenin is the precursor of the lipoproteins and phosphoproteins that make up most of the protein content of yolk. In the presence of estrogenic endocrine disruptive chemicals (EDCs), male fish can express the gene in a dose-dependent manner. This gene expression in male fish can be used as a molecular marker of exposure to estrogenic EDCs.

== Function ==
Vitellogenin provides the major egg yolk protein that is a source of nutrients during early development of egg-laying (oviparous) vertebrates and invertebrates. Although vitellogenin also carries some lipid for deposition in the yolk, the primary mechanism for deposition of yolk lipid is instead via VLDLs, at least in birds and reptiles. Vitellogenin precursors are multi-domain apolipoproteins (proteins that bind to lipids to form lipoproteins), that are cleaved into distinct yolk proteins. Different vitellogenin proteins exist, which are composed of variable combinations of yolk protein components; however, the cleavage sites are conserved.

== Components ==
In vertebrates, a complete vitellogenin is composed of:

- an N-terminal signal peptide for export,
- and four regions that can be cleaved into yolk proteins, these are:
  - lipovitellin-1,
  - phosvitin,
  - lipovitellin-2,
  - von Willebrand factor type D domain (YGP40).

== N-terminal lipid transport domain ==
Vitellogenin lipid transport domain, N-terminal

Identifiers
- Symbol: Vitellogenin_N
- Pfam: PF01347
- InterPro: IPR001747
- SMART: SM00638
- PROSITE: PS51211
- SCOP2: 1llv / SCOPe / SUPFAM
- OPM superfamily: 254
- OPM protein: 1lsh
Available protein structures:
- PDB: IPR001747 PF01347 (ECOD; PDBsum)
- AlphaFold: IPR001747; PF01347

This particular domain represents a conserved region found in several lipid transport proteins, including vitellogenin, microsomal triglyceride transfer protein and apolipoprotein B-100.

=== Vesicle trafficking ===
This particular domain, the Vitellogenin lipid transport domain, is also found in the Microsomal triglyceride transfer protein (MTTP) and in Apolipoprotein B. It aids cell trafficking and export of cargo.

==== Microsomal triglyceride transfer protein (MTTP) ====
Microsomal triglyceride transfer protein (MTTP) is an endoplasmic reticulum lipid transfer protein involved in the biosynthesis and lipid loading of apolipoprotein B. MTTP is also involved in the late stage of CD1d trafficking in the lysosomal compartment, CD1d being the MHC I-like lipid antigen presenting molecule.

==== Apolipoprotein B ====
Apolipoprotein B can exist in two forms: B-100 and B-48. Apolipoprotein B-100 is present on several lipoproteins, including very low-density lipoproteins (VLDL), intermediate density lipoproteins (IDL) and low density lipoproteins (LDL), and can assemble VLDL particles in the liver. Apolipoprotein B-100 has been linked to the development of atherosclerosis.

ApoB is ancestrally universal to all animals, as homologs are found in choanoflagellates. The insect homolog is called apolipophorin I/II.

=== Human proteins containing this domain ===
APOB (see native LDL-ApoB structure at 37°C on YouTube); MTTP;

== Honey bees ==
Honey bees deposit vitellogenin molecules in fat bodies in their abdomen and heads. The fat bodies apparently act as a food storage reservoir. The glycolipoprotein vitellogenin has additional functionality as it acts as an antioxidant to prolong Queen bee and forager lifespan as well as a hormone that affects future foraging behavior. The health of a honey bee colony is dependent upon the vitellogenin reserves of the nurse bees – the foragers having low levels of vitellogenin. As expendable laborers, the foragers are fed just enough protein to keep them working their risky task of collecting nectar and pollen. Vitellogenin levels are important during the nest stage and thus influence honey bee worker division of labor.

A nurse bee's vitellogenin titer that developed in the first four days after emergence, affects its subsequent age to begin foraging and whether it preferentially forages for nectar or pollen. If young workers are short on food their first days of life, they tend to begin foraging early and preferentially for nectar. If they are moderately fed, they forage at normal age preferentially for nectar. If they are abundantly fed, immediately after emergence, their vitellogenin titer is high and they begin foraging later in life, preferentially collecting pollen. Pollen is the only available protein source for honey bees.

=== Juvenile hormone feedback loop ===
For the majority of the investigated insect species it has been documented that juvenile hormone stimulates the transcription of the vitellogenin genes and the consequent control of vitellogenin production (cf. Hagedorn and Kunkel, 1979; Engelmann, 1983; Wyatt and Davey, 1996).

The vitellogenin expression is part of a regulatory feedback loop that enables vitellogenin and juvenile hormone to mutually suppress each other. Vitellogenin and juvenile hormone likely work antagonistically in the honey bee to regulate the honey bees development and behavior. Suppression of one leads to high titers of the other.

It is likely that the balance between vitellogenin and juvenile hormone levels is also involved in swarming behavior.

Juvenile hormone levels drop in honey bee colonies pre-swarming and it is expected that vitellogenin levels would therefore rise. One may surmise, that swarming bees would want to pack along as much vitellogenin as possible to extend their lifespan and to be able to quickly build a new nest.

== Evolution ==
Vertebrates started off with a single copy of the vitellogenin gene, and the bird-mammalian and amphibian lineages each experienced duplications that gave rise to the modern genes. With the exception of monotremes, mammals have all their vitellogenin genes turned into pseudogenes, although the region syntenic to bird VIT1-VIT2-VIT3 can still be found and aligned. In monotremes just one of the genes remained functional.

== See also ==
- Glycoprotein
- Lipoprotein
