= Gag-onc fusion protein =

Chimeric cancer-related protein

The gag-onc fusion protein is a general term for a fusion protein formed from a group-specific antigen ('gag') gene and that of an oncogene ('onc'), a gene that plays a role in the development of a cancer. The oncogene can originate from the host or be already present in the virus. In the latter case, the fusion is also called Gag-v-Onc, with "v" indicating that the Onc sequence resides in a viral genome. Onc is a generic placeholder for a given specific oncogene, such as C-jun. (In the case of a fusion with C-jun, the resulting "gag-jun" protein is known alternatively as p65).

== Background ==
Gag genes are part of a general architecture for retroviruses, viruses that replicate through reverse transcription, where the gag region of the genome encodes proteins that constitute the matrix, capsid and nucleocapsid of the mature virus particles. Like in HIV's replication cycle, these proteins are needed for viral budding from the host cell's plasma membrane, where the fully formed virions leave the cell to infect other cells.

== gag-v-onc ==
When a viral gene is introduced into the host cell and is sufficient to induce oncogenesis – the creation of cancerous cells – in the infected cell line, the gene is said to be a "viral transforming gene". When this type of gene is translated to a protein, the protein is called a "transforming protein". Note that since the viral oncogenes originated from a host genome, the transformation event is different from transduction, which describes the process of introducing non-native genes to a host organism via a viral infection.

=== Rous sarcoma virus ===
The Gag-v-Onc fusion protein from the Rous sarcoma virus illustrates the dual role that the fusion protein plays in the viral and host cellular life cycle. For example, the viral gene Src (as in "sarcoma") is not necessary for viral reproduction, but does affect virulence. Due to evidence of conserved homology between the v-Src gene and its host (animal) genomes, and its non-essential status for viral reproduction, the v-Src gene is likely to have been acquired from a host genome and altered by subsequent mutations. These subsequent mutations are responsible for the oncogenic capabilities of the virus, as the normal (host) version of the Src gene, c-Src, promotes survival, angiogenesis, proliferation and invasion pathways. These native pathways are disrupted in the presence of the mutant Src gene (v-Src) such that oncogenesis becomes more likely for the infected host cells, since the v-Src gene is translated into a functionally distinct version of its host counterpart.

=== Murine leukemia virus ===
In the case of the murine leukemia virus, a species of virus capable of causing cancer in murines (mice), the viral life cycle can also be responsible for oncogenesis through a Gag-v-Onc fusion protein called "Mo-MuLV(src)", which is a Gag-v-Src protein capable of inducing oncogenesis in living mice.

== See also ==
- Rous sarcoma virus
- Fusion protein
- Fusion gene
- Fusion transcript
- Chimeric gene
- Bcr-abl fusion protein
- Oncovirus
- Retrovirus
- Retrotransposon
- Retroposon
- Integrase
