= Phosvitin =

Egg yolk phosphoprotein

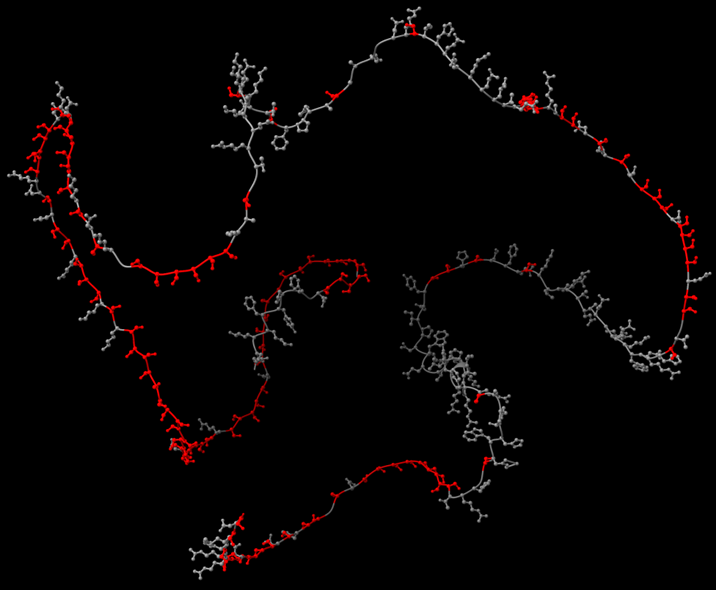
Phosvitin structure adapted from vitellogenin AlphaFold (AF-P02845-F1; residues 1112-1328) with serine residues highlighted in red. Visualized using ChimeraX.

Phosvitin is one of the egg (commonly hen's egg) yolk phosphoproteins known for being the most phosphorylated protein found in nature. Phosvitin isolation was first described by Mecham and Olcott in the year 1949. Recently it has been shown that phosvitin orchestrates nucleation and growth of biomimetic bone like apatite.

== Structure ==
As the most phosphorylated natural protein, phosvitin contains 123 phosphoserine residues accounting for 56.7% of its total 217 amino acid residues. The structure of phosvitin at large consists of 4-12 base pair stretches of serines, interspersed with amino acid residues lysine (6.9%), histidine (6.0%), and arginine (5.1%), among others in smaller quantities. Phosvitin's structure (right) is adapted from the protein vitellogenin (Gene: VTG2; Uniprot: P02845; residues 1-1850) generated by AlphaFold, where all the possible phosphorylated serine residues are highlighted in red. Phosvitin is one of four proteins cleaved from vitellogenin and is unstructured at neutral pH. Despite phosvitin only accounting for 16% of total proteins in egg yolk, it alone accounts for 60% of the total yolk phosphoproteins as well as 90% of the total yolk phosphorus.

== Function ==
Due to phosvitin's polyanionic activity, the protein performs functionalities such as metal chelation, emulsification, and nutrition sequestration for a growing embryo. Additionally, in recent research it has been shown that the disordered secondary structure of phosvitin orchestrates nucleation and growth of biomimetic bone like apatite.

== Health ==
Phosvitin might decrease the bioavailability of calcium, magnesium, and iron by reducing their absorption in the digestive tract.
