= WNT2 =

Protein-coding gene in the species Homo sapiens

Identifiers
- Aliases: WNT2, INT1L1, IRP, Wnt family member 2
- External IDs: OMIM: 147870; MGI: 98954; GeneCards: WNT2

Gene location (Human)
Chr.	Chromosome 7 (human)
Band	7q31.2	Start	117,275,451 bp
Band	7q31.2	End	117,323,152 bp

Gene location (Mouse)
Chr.	Chromosome 6 (mouse)
Band	6 A2|6 8.08 cM	Start	17,988,939 bp
Band	6 A2|6 8.08 cM	End	18,030,584 bp
RNA expression pattern
Bgee	Human / Mouse (ortholog); Top expressed in: stromal cell of endometrium; placenta; lower lobe of lung; upper lobe of left lung; testicle; right lung; gonad; visceral pleura; decidua; amniotic fluid / Top expressed in: prostatic urethra; septum transversum; muscle layer of urethra; lamina propria of prostatic urethra; abdominal wall; left lung lobe; sinus venosus; umbilical cord; primordial ventricle; lamina propria of vagina; More reference expression data
BioGPS	n/a
Gene ontology
Molecular function	frizzled binding; signaling receptor binding; cytokine activity; protein binding; receptor ligand activity
Cellular component	cytoplasm; extracellular matrix; Wnt signalosome; plasma membrane; extracellular region; extracellular space; extrinsic component of external side of plasma membrane; collagen-containing extracellular matrix
Biological process	positive regulation of mesenchymal cell proliferation; positive regulation of cardiac muscle cell proliferation; positive regulation of endothelial cell proliferation; mammary gland epithelium development; lung development; cell-cell signaling; multicellular organism development; positive regulation of DNA-binding transcription factor activity; neurogenesis; lens development in camera-type eye; cardiac epithelial to mesenchymal transition; lung induction; cellular response to retinoic acid; iris morphogenesis; cellular response to transforming growth factor beta stimulus; positive regulation of epithelial cell proliferation involved in lung morphogenesis; positive regulation of cell population proliferation; positive regulation of transcription by RNA polymerase II; cell fate commitment; labyrinthine layer blood vessel development; positive regulation of fibroblast proliferation; atrial cardiac muscle tissue morphogenesis; positive regulation of canonical Wnt signaling pathway; canonical Wnt signaling pathway; neuron differentiation; midbrain dopaminergic neuron differentiation; canonical Wnt signaling pathway involved in midbrain dopaminergic neuron differentiation; Wnt signaling pathway; regulation of signaling receptor activity; cell proliferation in midbrain
Sources:Amigo / QuickGO
Orthologs
Databases	NCBI: entry; OMA: entry
Species	Human	Mouse
Entrez	7472	22413
Ensembl	ENSG00000105989	ENSMUSG00000010797
UniProt	P09544	P21552
RefSeq (mRNA)	NM_003391	NM_023653
RefSeq (protein)	NP_003382	NP_076142
Location (UCSC)	Chr 7: 117.28 – 117.32 Mb	Chr 6: 17.99 – 18.03 Mb
PubMed search
- Wikidata
View/Edit Human	View/Edit Mouse

Wingless-type MMTV integration site family, member 2, also known as WNT2, is a human gene.

This gene is a member of the WNT gene family. The WNT gene family consists of structurally related genes that encode secreted signaling proteins involved in the Wnt signaling pathway. These proteins have been implicated in oncogenesis and in several developmental processes, including regulation of cell fate and patterning during embryogenesis. Alternatively spliced transcript variants have been identified for this gene.
