= Selenoprotein W =

Protein found in humans

SELENOW

Identifiers
- Aliases: SELENOW, selW, SEPW1, selenoprotein W, 1, selenoprotein W
- External IDs: OMIM: 603235; MGI: 1100878; GeneCards: SELENOW
Available structures
PDB	Ortholog search: PDBe RCSB
PDB	List of PDB id codes 2NPB

Gene location (Human)
Chr.	Chromosome 19 (human)
Band	19q13.33	Start	47,778,677 bp
Band	19q13.33	End	47,784,686 bp

Gene location (Mouse)
Chr.	Chromosome 7 (mouse)
Band	7|7 A2	Start	15,651,133 bp
Band	7|7 A2	End	15,656,327 bp
RNA expression pattern
Bgee	Human / Mouse (ortholog); Top expressed in: apex of heart; prefrontal cortex; right frontal lobe; amygdala; hippocampus proper; cingulate gyrus; caudate nucleus; anterior cingulate cortex; nucleus accumbens; inferior ganglion of vagus nerve / Top expressed in: saccule; supraoptic nucleus; triceps brachii muscle; temporal lobe; otic vesicle; globus pallidus; prefrontal cortex; dentate gyrus; aortic valve; dentate gyrus of hippocampal formation granule cell; More reference expression data
BioGPS	n/a
Gene ontology
Molecular function	antioxidant activity
Cellular component	cytoplasm; cytosol
Biological process	cellular oxidant detoxification; response to selenium ion
Sources:Amigo / QuickGO
Orthologs
Databases	NCBI: entry; OMA: entry
Species	Human	Mouse
Entrez	6415	20364
Ensembl	ENSG00000178980	ENSMUSG00000041571
UniProt	P63302	P63300
RefSeq (mRNA)	NM_003009	NM_009156
RefSeq (protein)	NP_003000	NP_033182
Location (UCSC)	Chr 19: 47.78 – 47.78 Mb	Chr 7: 15.65 – 15.66 Mb
PubMed search
- Wikidata
View/Edit Human	View/Edit Mouse

Selenoprotein W is a protein that in humans is encoded by the SELENOW gene (previously SEPW1).

== Function ==
This gene encodes a selenoprotein, which contains a selenocysteine (Sec) residue at its active site. The selenocysteine is encoded by the UGA codon that normally signals translation termination. The 3' UTR of selenoprotein genes have a common stem-loop structure, the sec insertion sequence (SECIS), that is necessary for the recognition of UGA as a Sec codon rather than as a stop signal. This protein shows highest expression in skeletal muscle and heart, and may be involved in oxidation-reduction reactions. A retroprocessed pseudogene, SEPW1P, has been identified and mapped to chromosome 1p35-34.
