= Nuclear cap-binding protein complex =

RNA-binding protein

nuclear cap-binding protein complex
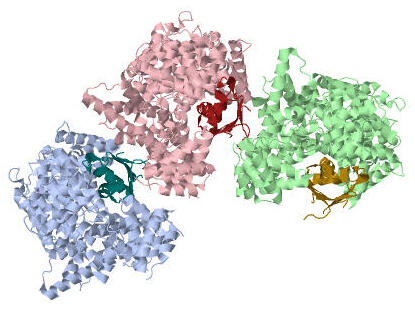
- Crystal structure of the human nuclear cap-binding complex.

Identifiers
- Symbol: NCBP1
- Alt. symbols: NCBP
- NCBI gene: 4686
- HGNC: 7658
- RefSeq: NM_002486

Other data
- Locus: Chr. 9 q34.1

Nuclear cap binding protein subunit 2, 20kDa

Identifiers
- Symbol: NCBP2
- NCBI gene: 22916
- HGNC: 7659
- OMIM: 605133
- RefSeq: NM_007362
- UniProt: P52298

Other data
- Locus: Chr. 3 q29
Search for
- Structures: Swiss-model
- Domains: InterPro

Nuclear cap-binding protein complex is a RNA-binding protein which binds to the 5' cap of pre-mRNA. The cap and nuclear cap-binding protein have many functions in mRNA biogenesis including splicing, 3'-end formation by stabilizing the interaction of the 3'-end processing machinery, nuclear export and protection of the transcripts from nuclease degradation. During mRNA export, the nuclear cap-binding protein complex recruits ribosomes to begin the pioneer round of translation. When RNA is exported to the cytoplasm the nuclear cap-binding protein complex is replaced by cytoplasmic cap binding complex. The nuclear cap-binding complex is a functional heterodimer and composed of Cbc1/Cbc2 in yeast and CBP20/CBP80 in multicellular eukaryotes. Human nuclear cap-binding protein complex shows the large subunit, CBP80 consists of 757 amino acid residues. Its secondary structure contains approximately sixty percent of helical and one percent of beta sheet in the strand. The small subunit, CBP20 has 98 amino acid residues. Its secondary structure contains approximately twenty percent of helical and twenty-four percent of beta sheet in the strand. Human nuclear cap-binding protein complex plays important role in the maturation of pre-mRNA and in uracil-rich small nuclear RNA.

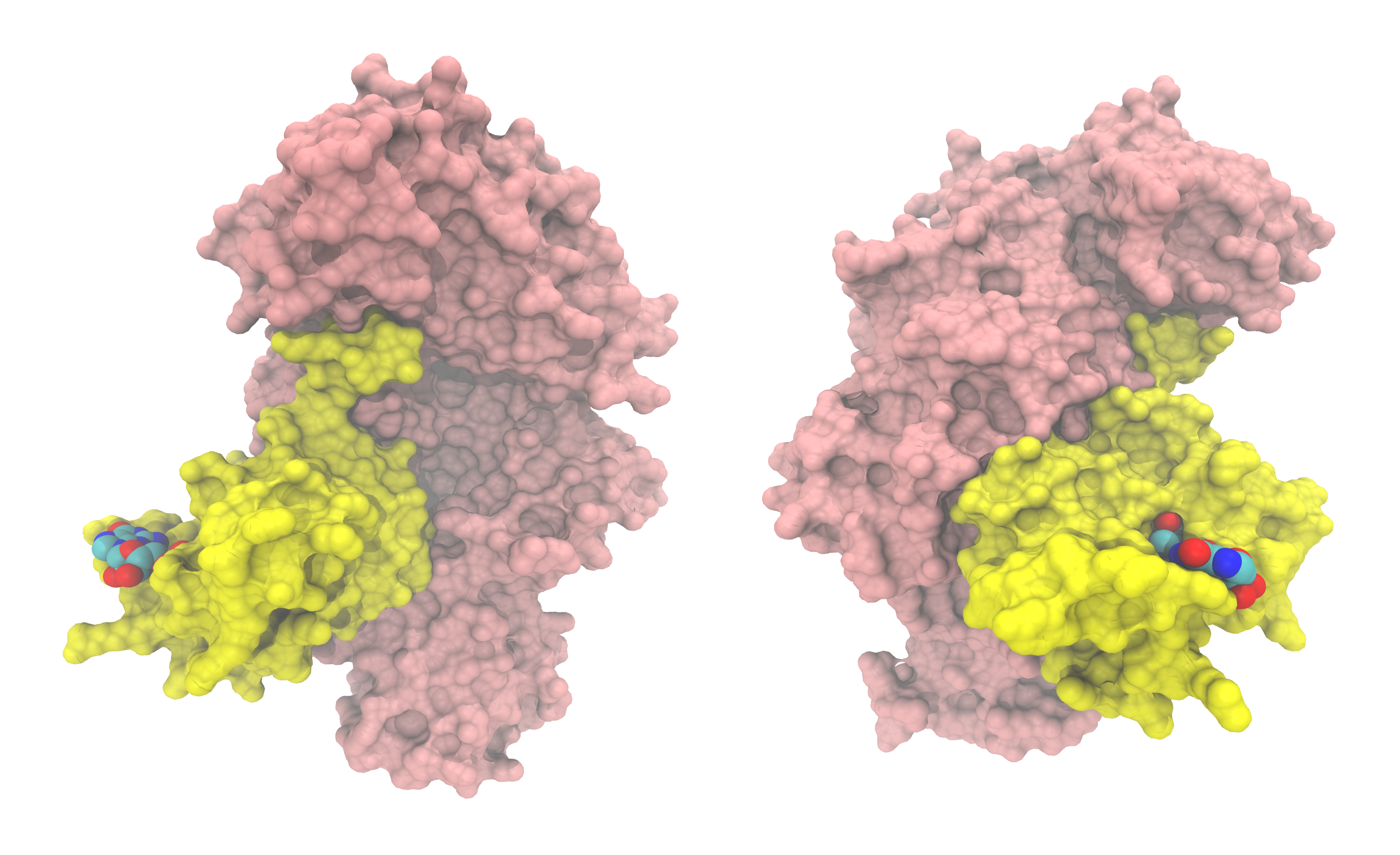
Nuclear cap-binding protein complex

== Structure ==
In eukaryotes, the nuclear cap-binding protein complex is a heterodimer that is composed of two subunits, CBP80 and CBP20. The CBP20 subunit binds to the cap while CBP80 ensures high-affinity cap binding. The CBP80 is a superhelical structure and it is made up of three domains that are connected by two linkers. Domain 1 of CBP80 plays an important role in cap-dependent translation of mRNA. CBP80 ensures high-affinity cap binding by stabilizing the N-terminal loop of CBP20 which locks the cap-binding protein complex into a high-affinity cap-binding state. The CBP20 is composed of the C-terminus, the RNP domain, and the N-terminus. The CBP20 goes through a conformational change when it is bound to the pre-mRNA, it transitions from an open state to a closed, folded state. The conformational change results from a hinge-like motion of the N terminus from the alpha helixes in the α2–α3 loop towards the β-sheets. There is little change in the RNP region of CBP20 in the bound and un-bound states, which indicates this region may act as the initial binding site for the cap structure.

== Role in translation ==
In mammals, the nuclear cap-binding complex can drive and is necessary to initiate the translation of mRNA through cap-binding complex-dependent translation. The cap-binding complex-dependent translation has an important role in protein synthesis and mRNA surveillance. The translation of nuclear cap-binding complex-bound mRNA serves to control the quality of gene expression, while the translation of eIF4E-bound mRNAs serves to produce the majority of proteins. However, both of these mRNAs use many of the same translation initiation factors; such as PABPC1, eIF4G, eIF3, eIF4B, eIF4A and eIF2. Translation is started when the 40S ribosomal subunit binds to the nuclear cap-binding protein complex and finds the start codon through a scanning complex in the 5' to 3' direction. The first round of translation is primarily mediated by the nuclear cap-binding protein complex, since freshly synthesized mRNA have a 5'-end cap that is bound to the nuclear cap-binding protein complex. The cap-binding site of the nuclear cap-binding protein complex needs to be regulated so the pre-mRNA can lose this complex and become mature RNA. In some instances, the nuclear cap-binding complex is replaced by eIF4E in a translation-independent manner in order to continue translation of the mRNA. To finish creating mature mRNA the nuclear cap-binding protein complex is bound to a 5’-m7GpppN cap structure, the cap structure then binds to the eukaryotic translation initiation factor 4E (eIF4E) which directs steady-state rounds of mRNA translation. This process of translation changes from cap-binding complex dependent translation to eIF4E-dependent translation.

== Role in quality assurance ==
=== Quality assurance during pioneer round ===
The nuclear cap-binding protein complex supports the pioneer round of mRNA translation, this pioneer round is important for mRNA quality control. The pioneer round consists of the loading of one or more ribosomes, depending on the efficacy of translation initiation and the length of the open translational reading frame in order to remove premature stop codons. It is thought that the CBP80 subunit could be an effector of the pioneer stage since the binding of the nuclear cap-binding protein complex to the cap site is stimulated by growth factors during the G1/S phase.

=== Quality assurance through nonsense-mediated decay ===
The nuclear cap-binding complex has a larger role in mRNA quality control than it does in actual protein synthesis. One of the ways that it does this quality control is through nonsense-mediated decay. Nonsense-mediated decay is when faulty mRNA's that have stop codons too early are recognized by the SURF complex and down-regulated. Nonsense-mediated decay is thought to be triggered when the first ribosome that translated a new nuclear cap-binding protein complex-bound mRNA has a stop codon that is found more than 50-55 nucleotides upstream of an exon-junction complex-bearing exon-exon junction. The nuclear cap-binding complex is crucial to nonsense-mediated decay because it makes up the mRNP that harbors the exon-junction complex and because CBP80 directly interacts with the nonsense-mediated decay factor, up-frameshift 1 (UPF1) which amplifies the efficiency of the whole process. The nuclear cap-binding complex is largely important in this process as it has been found that nonsense-mediated decay is only found in nuclear cap-binding complex-bound mRNA.

== Stress conditions ==
Nuclear cap-binding complex-dependent translation was found to be relatively unaffected by certain environmental stressors such as in hypoxic, heat shock, or serum-starved conditions, while eIF4E-dependent translation was found to be greatly affected. In heat shock and serum-starved conditions nuclear cap-binding complex-dependent translation is greatly favored over eIF4E-dependent translation. This could mean that nuclear cap-binding complex-dependent translation has the potential to support translation in high stress environments.
