= Helminth protein =

A helminth protein, or helminthic antigen, is a protein derived from a parasitic worm that causes an immune reaction. When secreted, these proteins may modify the host's immune response in order to promote longevity of the parasite. Helminth proteins can result in a deregulated response to infection, and are implicated in reduced reactivity to other antigens. Other helminth proteins promote parasite survival in other ways, particularly since parasites must depend on hosts for the supply of essential nutrients. Despite their pathogenic properties, helminth proteins have potential to be co-opted to treat a number of other human diseases.

== Immunoregulation ==
Helminth proteins modulate the immune response of their hosts, but do not suppress it entirely. A number of proteins are able to induce production of IL-10, an anti-inflammatory cytokine. IL-10 is partially responsible for reducing expression of co-stimulatory molecules such as CD86 on macrophages. CD86 is one of the proteins which interact with CD28 to activate T helper cells; without it, T helper cell response is mitigated. Schistosome proteins also contain abundant proteases which and cleave IgE antibodies. Alpha-1, a protein released by schistosome eggs, can also be a chemokine binding protein, preventing the recruitment of other immune cells like neutrophils. T. canis C-type lectins are additionally able to bind to mammalian carbohydrates, suggesting that they may promote evasion of the host's immune system by preventing the migration of host immune cells.

A number of helminth species also secrete high levels of antioxidants to avoid phagocytosis; those antioxidants are needed because phagocytes like macrophages frequently produce reactive oxygen species like oxygen radicals, superoxide, and hydrogen peroxide to attack parasites. Additionally, many nematodes residing in the gut may secrete acetylcholinesterase, which is responsible for the degradation of acetylcholine to terminate neuronal signals. Acetylcholinesterase may prevent parasite clearance from the gut by preventing acetylcholine-mediated signaling from stimulating the production of intestinal chloride and mucus.

== Lipid Acquisition ==
Parasites like helminths do not synthesize their own fatty acids or sterols, and are consequently dependent on their hosts for essential nutrients. A number of different classes of lipid-binding proteins have been investigated and characterized. Of these, NPA (nematode polyprotein antigen/allergen) FAR, and Sj-FABPc demonstrate different binding affinities for fatty acids and/or retinoids. Ov-FAR-1, which is produced by the riverblindness parasite Onchocerca volvulus binds retinol with great affinity, and this activity may result in the pathology it causes. Ov-FAR-1, however, binds fatty acids with less affinity. On the other hand, Sj-FABPc, found in Schistosoma japonicum, binds fatty acids with high affinity, but does not bind to retinol. All three of these proteins are able to deliver lipids to acceptor membranes, but this transfer process in Ov-FAR-1 and ABA-1A1 (a type of NPA) requires an aqueous diffusion step. Sj-FABPc uses a collision mechanism, and transfer is not affected by changing salt concentrations, suggesting that it may be important to intracellular targeted transport and metabolism of fatty acids. Ov-FAR-1 and ABA-1A1 may instead behave similarly to extracellular lipid-binding proteins.

== Genomic Prediction ==
The Helminth Secretome Database (HSD) is a repository for helminth proteins predicted using expressed sequence tags (ESTs). Previously identified ESTs, which correspond to known helminth proteins, are used to predict the location and function of newly discovered helminth proteins based on genomic sequencing. Additionally, the database can also be used to develop protein targets for new drugs to treat helminth infections.

== Potential Therapeutics ==
Given the modulatory properties of helminth proteins, it has been suggested that they may be co-opted to successfully treat other human diseases, particularly those associated with auto-immunity disorders. In particular, immunization with P28GST, a schistosome glutathione S-transferase enzyme in rats has been shown to reduce colitis lesions and expression of pro-inflammatory cytokines by eosinophil responses to inflammation. P28GST is thus a promising potential therapeutic for treating inflammatory bowel diseases like Crohn's disease and ulcerative colitis.

Additionally, injection of proteins secreted by Fasciola hepatica in nonobese diabetic mice prevented the onset of type I diabetes, with 84% of the mice showing normal glucose levels 26 weeks after injection. This phenomenon is attributed to the suppression of interferon-gamma secretion from autoreactive T cells following the activation of regulatory M2 macrophages. This result supports the possibility of eventually using helminth products to treat type I diabetes in humans as well.
