= Oligosaccharide reducing-end xylanase =

Enzyme

Identifiers
- EC no.: 3.2.1.156
- CAS no.: 879497-03-7

Databases
- IntEnz: IntEnz view
- BRENDA: BRENDA entry
- ExPASy: NiceZyme view
- KEGG: KEGG entry
- MetaCyc: metabolic pathway
- PRIAM: profile
- PDB structures: RCSB PDB PDBe PDBsum
Search
- PMC: articles
- PubMed: articles
- NCBI: proteins

Oligosaccharide reducing-end xylanase (EC 3.2.1.156, Rex, reducing end xylose-releasing exo-oligoxylanase) is an enzyme with systematic name beta-D-xylopyranosyl-(1->4)-beta-D-xylopyranose reducing-end xylanase. This enzyme catalyses the following chemical reaction

Hydrolysis of (1->4)-beta-D-xylose residues from the reducing end of oligosaccharides

The enzyme acts rapidly on the beta-anomer of beta-D-xylopyranosyl-(1->4)-beta-D-xylopyranose.
