= Stathmin =

Protein in Eukaryotes

STMN1

Identifiers
- Aliases: STMN1, C1orf215, LAP18, Lag, OP18, PP17, PP19, PR22, SMN, stathmin 1
- External IDs: OMIM: 151442; MGI: 96739; GeneCards: STMN1

Gene location (Human)
Chr.	Chromosome 1 (human)
Band	1p36.11	Start	25,884,181 bp
Band	1p36.11	End	25,906,991 bp

Gene location (Mouse)
Chr.	Chromosome 4 (mouse)
Band	4 D2.3|4 66.76 cM	Start	134,195,631 bp
Band	4 D2.3|4 66.76 cM	End	134,201,154 bp
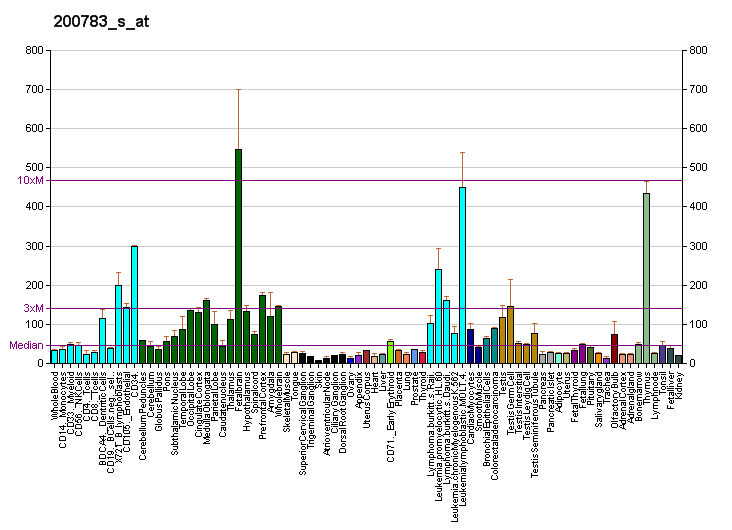
RNA expression pattern
Bgee	Human / Mouse (ortholog); Top expressed in: ganglionic eminence; ventricular zone; C1 segment; right frontal lobe; right testis; left testis; right hemisphere of cerebellum; gonad; prefrontal cortex; Brodmann area 9 / Top expressed in: ganglionic eminence; neural tube; mesencephalon; ventricular zone; hypothalamus; Cortex of frontal lobe; thymus; striatum of neuraxis; olfactory bulb; rhombencephalon; More reference expression data
BioGPS	More reference expression data
Gene ontology
Molecular function	protein binding; signal transducer activity; tubulin binding
Cellular component	intracellular anatomical structure; cytoplasm; cytoskeleton; microtubule; membrane; cytosol; extracellular exosome; neuron projection
Biological process	nervous system development; mitotic spindle organization; multicellular organism development; cell differentiation; intracellular signal transduction; response to virus; axonogenesis; neuron projection development; signal transduction; brain development; mitotic cytokinesis; microtubule depolymerization; regulation of microtubule polymerization or depolymerization; negative regulation of microtubule polymerization; negative regulation of Rho protein signal transduction; hepatocyte growth factor receptor signaling pathway; negative regulation of stress fiber assembly; establishment of skin barrier; negative regulation of thrombin-activated receptor signaling pathway; negative regulation of guanyl-nucleotide exchange factor activity; regulation of cytoskeleton organization
Sources:Amigo / QuickGO
Orthologs
Databases	NCBI: entry; OMA: entry
Species	Human	Mouse
Entrez	3925	16765
Ensembl	ENSG00000117632	ENSMUSG00000028832
UniProt	P16949	P54227
RefSeq (mRNA)	NM_203401; NM_001145454; NM_005563; NM_152497; NM_203399	NM_019641
RefSeq (protein)	NP_001138926; NP_005554; NP_981944; NP_981946	NP_062615
Location (UCSC)	Chr 1: 25.88 – 25.91 Mb	Chr 4: 134.2 – 134.2 Mb
PubMed search
- Wikidata
View/Edit Human	View/Edit Mouse

Stathmin, also known as metablastin and oncoprotein 18, is a protein that in humans is encoded by the STMN1 gene.

Stathmin is a highly conserved 17 kDa protein that is crucial for the regulation of the cell cytoskeleton. Changes in the cytoskeleton are important because the cytoskeleton is a scaffold required for many cellular processes, such as cytoplasmic organization, cell division and cell motility. More specifically, stathmin is crucial in regulating the cell cycle. It is found solely in eukaryotes.

Its function as an important regulatory protein of microtubule dynamics has been well-characterized. Eukaryotic microtubules are one of three major components of the cell's cytoskeleton. They are highly dynamic structures that continuously alternate between assembly and disassembly. Stathmin performs an important function in regulating rapid microtubule remodeling of the cytoskeleton in response to the cell's needs. Microtubules are cylindrical polymers of α,β-tubulin. Their assembly is in part determined by the concentration of free tubulin in the cytoplasm.

At low concentrations of free tubulin, the growth rate at the microtubule ends is slowed and results in an increased rate of depolymerization (disassembly).

== Structure ==
Stathmin, and the related proteins SCG10 and XB3, contain a N-terminal domain (XB3 contains an additional N-terminal hydrophobic region), a 78 amino acid coiled-coil region, and a short C-terminal domain.

== Function ==
The function of Stathmin is to regulate the cytoskeleton of the cell. The cytoskeleton is made up of long hollow cylinders named microtubules. These microtubules are made up of alpha and beta tubulin heterodimers. The changes in cytoskeleton are known as microtubule dynamics; the addition of the tubulin subunits lead to polymerisation and their loss, depolymerisation. Stathmin regulates these by promoting depolymerization of microtubules or preventing polymerization of tubulin heterodimers.

Additionally, Stathmin is thought to have a role in cell signaling pathway. Stathmin is a ubiquitous phosphorylated protein which makes it act as an intracellular relay for diverse regulatory pathways, functioning through a variety of second messengers.

Its phosphorylation and gene expression are regulated throughout development and in response to extracellular signals regulating cell proliferation, differentiation and function.

== Interactions ==
Stathmin
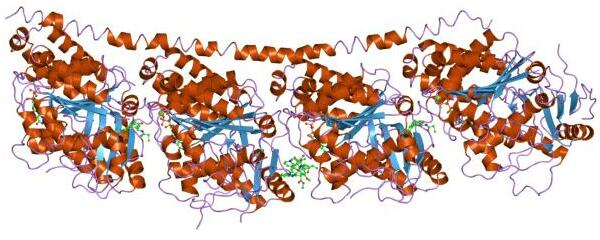
- Structure of Tubulin-Colchicine-Vinblastine: Stathmin-like domain complex

Identifiers
- Symbol: Stathmin
- Pfam: PF00836
- InterPro: IPR000956
- PROSITE: PDOC00487
- SCOP2: 1sa0 / SCOPe / SUPFAM
Available protein structures:
- PDB: IPR000956 PF00836 (ECOD; PDBsum)
- AlphaFold: IPR000956; PF00836

Stathmin interacts with two molecules of dimeric α,β-tubulin to form a tight ternary complex called the T2S complex. One mole of stathmin binds to two moles of tubulin dimers through the stathmin-like domain (SLD). When stathmin sequesters tubulin into the T2S complex, tubulin becomes non-polymerizable. Without tubulin polymerization, there is no microtubule assembly. Stathmin also promotes microtubule disassembly by acting directly on the microtubule ends.

The rate of microtubule assembly is an important aspect of cell growth therefore associating regulation of stathmin with cell cycle progress. Regulation of stathmin is cell cycle dependent and controlled by the cell's protein kinases in response to specific cell signals. Phosphorylation at four serine residues on stathmin named Ser16, Ser25, Ser38 and Ser63 causes weakened stathmin-tubulin binding. Stathmin phosphorylation increases the concentration of tubulin available in the cytoplasm for microtubule assembly. For cells to assemble the mitotic spindle necessary for initiation of the mitotic phase of the cell cycle, stathmin phosphorylation must occur. Without microtubule growth and assembly, the mitotic spindle cannot form, and the cell cycle is arrested. At cytokinesis, the last phase of the cell cycle, rapid dephosphorylation of stathmin occurs to block the cell from entering back into the cell cycle until it is ready.

== Clinical significance ==
Stathmin's role in regulation of the cell cycle causes it to be an oncoprotein named oncoprotein 18 (op18). Stathmin (a.k.a. op18) can cause uncontrolled cell proliferation when mutated and not functioning properly. If stathmin is unable to bind to tubulin, it allows for constant microtubule assembly and therefore constant mitotic spindle assembly. With no regulation of the mitotic spindle, the cell cycle is capable of cycling uncontrollably resulting in the unregulated cell growth characteristic of cancer cells.

== Role in social behaviour ==
Mice without stathmin have deficiency in innate and learned fear. Stathmin−/− females do not assess threats well, leading to lack of innate parental care and adult social interactions. They lack motivation for retrieving pups and are unable to choose a safe location for nest-building. However, they have an enhancement in social interactions.
