= Apoprotein =

Apoprotein may refer to:

- Apoenzyme, the protein part of an enzyme without its characteristic prosthetic group
- Apolipoprotein, a lipid-binding protein that is a constituent of the plasma lipoprotein
