= Nitrate reductase (NADPH) =

Enzyme family

Identifiers
- EC no.: 1.7.1.3
- CAS no.: 9029-28-1

Databases
- IntEnz: IntEnz view
- BRENDA: BRENDA entry
- ExPASy: NiceZyme view
- KEGG: KEGG entry
- MetaCyc: metabolic pathway
- PRIAM: profile
- PDB structures: RCSB PDB PDBe PDBsum
Search
- PMC: articles
- PubMed: articles
- NCBI: proteins

Nitrate reductase (NADPH) (EC 1.7.1.3, assimilatory nitrate reductase, assimilatory reduced nicotinamide adenine dinucleotide phosphate-nitrate reductase, NADPH-nitrate reductase, assimilatory NADPH-nitrate reductase, triphosphopyridine nucleotide-nitrate reductase, NADPH:nitrate reductase, nitrate reductase (NADPH_{2}), NADPH_{2}:nitrate oxidoreductase) is an enzyme with systematic name nitrite:NADP^{+} oxidoreductase. This enzyme catalises the following chemical reaction

nitrite + NADP^{+} + H_{2}O $\rightleftharpoons$ nitrate + NADPH + H^{+}

Nitrate reductase is an iron-sulfur molybdenum flavoprotein.
