= ZFP36L1 =

Protein-coding gene in the species Homo sapiens

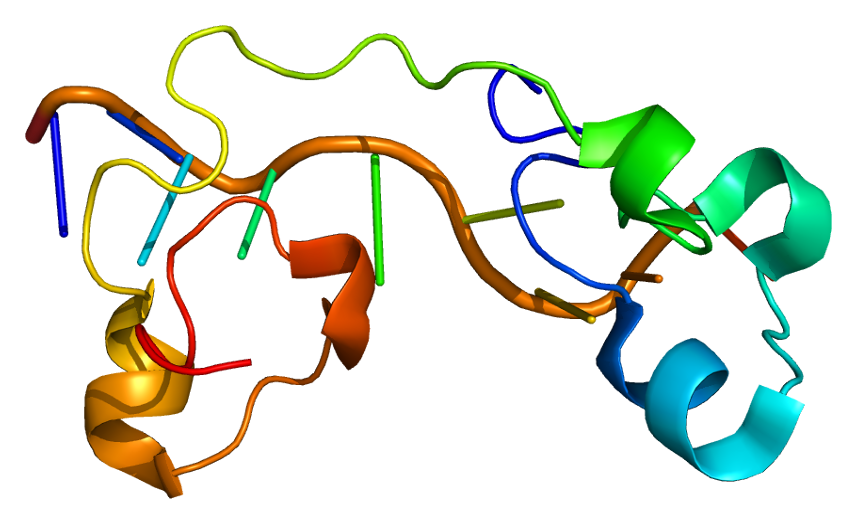

Identifiers
- Aliases: ZFP36L1, BRF1, Berg36, ERF-1, ERF1, RNF162B, TIS11B, cMG1, ZFP36 ring finger protein-like 1, ZFP36 ring finger protein like 1
- External IDs: OMIM: 601064; MGI: 107946; GeneCards: ZFP36L1
Available structures
PDB	Ortholog search: PDBe RCSB
PDB	List of PDB id codes 1W0V, 1W0W

Gene location (Human)
Chr.	Chromosome 14 (human)
Band	14q24.1	Start	68,787,660 bp
Band	14q24.1	End	68,796,253 bp

Gene location (Mouse)
Chr.	Chromosome 12 (mouse)
Band	12|12 C3	Start	80,154,528 bp
Band	12|12 C3	End	80,159,787 bp
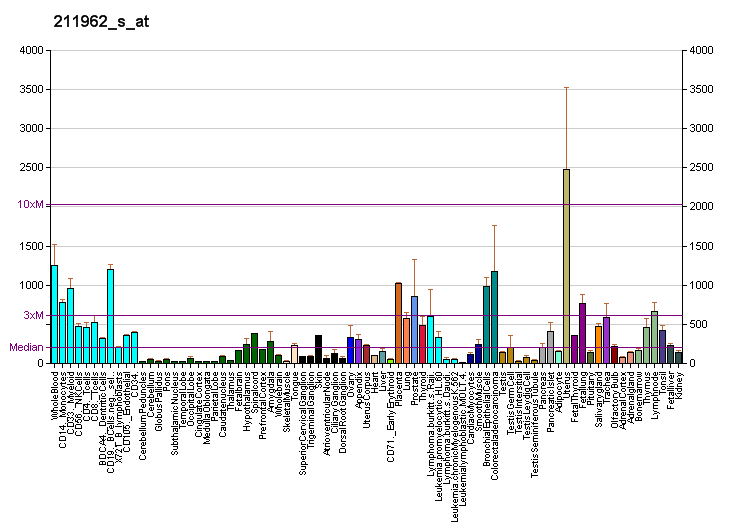

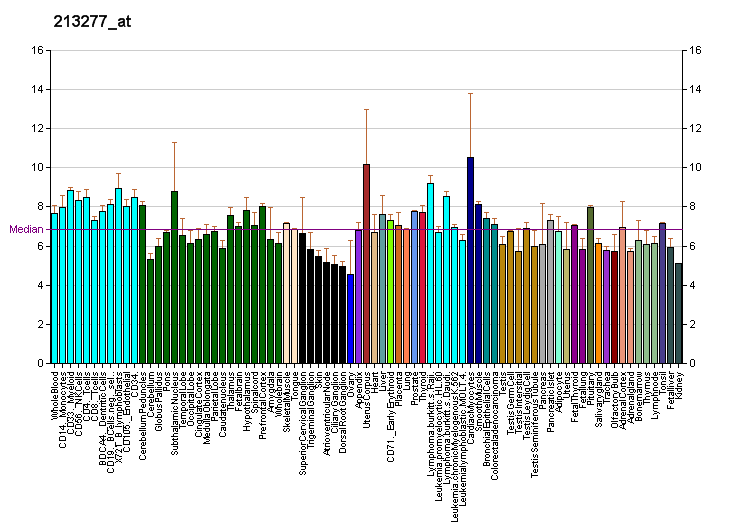
RNA expression pattern
Bgee	Human / Mouse (ortholog); Top expressed in: mucosa of paranasal sinus; canal of the cervix; gastric mucosa; right ovary; ectocervix; nipple; left ovary; urethra; body of uterus; right uterine tube / Top expressed in: corneal stroma; genital tubercle; ventricular zone; lactiferous gland; lip; yolk sac; esophagus; cardiac muscle tissue of left ventricle; superior surface of tongue; atrium; More reference expression data
BioGPS	More reference expression data
Gene ontology
Molecular function	DNA binding; DNA-binding transcription factor activity; metal ion binding; protein binding; mRNA binding; 14-3-3 protein binding; RNA binding; mRNA 3'-UTR AU-rich region binding; DNA-binding transcription factor activity, RNA polymerase II-specific; mRNA 3'-UTR binding
Cellular component	cytoplasm; nucleus; cytosol; P-body; ribonucleoprotein complex
Biological process	spongiotrophoblast layer development; mRNA catabolic process; multicellular organism growth; embryonic organ development; chorio-allantoic fusion; vasculogenesis; proepicardium development; development of the heart; nuclear-transcribed mRNA catabolic process, deadenylation-dependent decay; neural tube development; cell population proliferation; regulation of translation; apoptotic process; T cell differentiation in thymus; regulation of gene expression; negative regulation of erythrocyte differentiation; cellular response to insulin stimulus; cellular response to phorbol 13-acetate 12-myristate; ERK1 and ERK2 cascade; positive regulation of intracellular mRNA localization; cellular response to glucocorticoid stimulus; cellular response to transforming growth factor beta stimulus; regulation of keratinocyte differentiation; response to wounding; positive regulation of monocyte differentiation; regulation of transcription, DNA-templated; cellular response to hypoxia; regulation of keratinocyte apoptotic process; regulation of keratinocyte proliferation; phosphatidylinositol 3-kinase signaling; cellular response to tumor necrosis factor; cellular response to epidermal growth factor stimulus; regulation of mRNA 3'-end processing; MAPK cascade; mRNA processing; multicellular organism development; nuclear-transcribed mRNA catabolic process, deadenylation-independent decay; p38MAPK cascade; regulation of mRNA stability; protein kinase B signaling; cellular response to fibroblast growth factor stimulus; regulation of B cell differentiation; positive regulation of fat cell differentiation; regulation of myoblast differentiation; mesendoderm development; mRNA transport; 3'-UTR-mediated mRNA destabilization; cellular response to cAMP; cellular response to peptide hormone stimulus; cellular response to salt stress; regulation of stem cell proliferation; cellular response to raffinose; positive regulation of nuclear-transcribed mRNA catabolic process, deadenylation-dependent decay; negative regulation of mitotic cell cycle phase transition; transport; regulation of transcription by RNA polymerase II
Sources:Amigo / QuickGO
Orthologs
Databases	NCBI: entry; OMA: entry
Species	Human	Mouse
Entrez	677	12192
Ensembl	ENSG00000185650	ENSMUSG00000021127
UniProt	Q07352	P23950
RefSeq (mRNA)	NM_004926; NM_001244698; NM_001244701	NM_007564
RefSeq (protein)	NP_001231627; NP_001231630; NP_004917	NP_031590
Location (UCSC)	Chr 14: 68.79 – 68.8 Mb	Chr 12: 80.15 – 80.16 Mb
PubMed search
- Wikidata
View/Edit Human	View/Edit Mouse

Butyrate response factor 1 is a protein that in humans is encoded by the ZFP36L1 gene.

== Function ==
This gene is a member of the TIS11 family of early response genes. Family members are induced by various agonists such as the phorbol ester TPA and the polypeptide mitogen EGF. The gene is well conserved across species and has a promoter that contains motifs seen in other early-response genes. The encoded protein contains a distinguishing putative zinc finger domain with a repeating cys-his motif. This RNA binding protein most likely functions in regulating the response to growth factors.

ZFP36L1 can degrade transcripts of numerous components of senescence-associated secretory phenotype (SASP) factors.

== Interactions ==
ZFP36L1 has been shown to interact with MAPK14.
