= Nitrate reductase (NAD(P)H) =

Identifiers
- EC no.: 1.7.1.2
- CAS no.: 9029-27-0

Databases
- IntEnz: IntEnz view
- BRENDA: BRENDA entry
- ExPASy: NiceZyme view
- KEGG: KEGG entry
- MetaCyc: metabolic pathway
- PRIAM: profile
- PDB structures: RCSB PDB PDBe PDBsum
Search
- PMC: articles
- PubMed: articles
- NCBI: proteins

Nitrate reductase (NAD(P)H) (EC 1.7.1.2, assimilatory nitrate reductase, assimilatory NAD(P)H-nitrate reductase, NAD(P)H bispecific nitrate reductase, nitrate reductase (reduced nicotinamide adenine dinucleotide (phosphate)), nitrate reductase NAD(P)H, NAD(P)H-nitrate reductase, nitrate reductase [NAD(P)H_{2}], NAD(P)H_{2}:nitrate oxidoreductase) is an enzyme with systematic name nitrite:NAD(P)^{+} oxidoreductase. This enzyme catalises the following chemical reaction

nitrite + NAD(P)^{+} + H_{2}O $\rightleftharpoons$ nitrate + NAD(P)H + H^{+}

Nitrate reductase is an iron-sulfur molybdenum flavoprotein.
