= Adenovirus E1B protein =

Protein in adenoviruses

Identifiers
- Organism: Human adenovirus C
- Symbol: E1B
- Entrez: 2652981
- Orthologs: NCBI: entry; OMA: entry
- RefSeq (Prot): NP_040510.1
- UniProt: P03247

Other data
- Chromosome: Genomic: 0 - 0 Mb
Search for
- Structures: Swiss-model
- Domains: InterPro

Adenovirus E1B protein usually refers to one of two proteins transcribed from the E1B gene of the adenovirus: a 55kDa protein and a 19kDa protein. These two proteins are needed to block apoptosis in adenovirus-infected cells. E1B proteins work to prevent apoptosis that is induced by the small adenovirus E1A protein, which stabilizes p53, a tumor suppressor.

== Functions ==
=== E1B-19k ===
E1B-19k blocks a p53-independent apoptosis mechanism. Without E1B-19k, degradation of both cellular and viral DNA occurs, in addition to premature host cell death during the lytic cycle, thus limiting viral replication. E1B-19k mimics MCL1, which is a cellular antiapoptotic protein. In infected cells, the expression of E1A results in the degradation of MCL-1, which normally binds the proapoptotic protein, BAK. BAK activation induces apoptosis by co-oligomerizing with another proapoptotic protein, BAX. Together, BAK and BAX form pores in the mitochondrial membrane, releasing apoptogenic proteins like cytochrome c. This and other proteins released from the mitochondria lead to activation of caspase-9 and caspase-3 and the resulting apoptotic program. However, in adenovirus-infected cells, activated BAK and BAX are sequestered by E1B-19k, preventing the pathway.

=== E1B-55k ===
E1B-55k blocks p53 from inhibiting cell cycling and stops it from inducing apoptosis. Observations show that E1b-55k inhibits activation by p53 by binding a repression domain to it, converting it from an activator to a repressor of p53-activated genes. This stabilizes p53 and causes a large increase in p53 concentration. Additionally, p53 bound to E1B-55k has an affinity for its binding site that is ten times higher than free p53. Presumably, this increased affinity and concentration of p53 turns the p53-E1B-55k complex into a powerful repressor.

E1B-55k also forms a complex with E4orf6, a viral protein. The E1B-55k/E4orf6 complex in infected cells assembles with other cellular proteins to form a ubiquitin ligase complex. Essentially, the E1B-55k/E4orf6 complex takes over the cellular ubiquitin ligase complexes and gives them viral substrate-recognition subunits. There are two known substrates for this ubiquitin ligases; p53 and the MRN complex. The MRN complex, if not bound by the E1B-55K/E4orf6 ubiquitin ligase, will treat the ends of the viral DNA like a double-stranded DNA break and the viral DNA becomes ligated into long concatemers of randomly assorted genomes.

Structural and bioinformatics studies have shown that E1B-55k, which is specific to mammalian mastadenoviruses, has evolved by exaptation from an LH3-like minor capsid protein encoded by atadenoviruses.

== See also ==
- Oncolytic adenovirus
