= Nitrate reductase (NADH) =

Class of enzymes

Identifiers
- EC no.: 1.7.1.1
- CAS no.: 9013-03-0

Databases
- IntEnz: IntEnz view
- BRENDA: BRENDA entry
- ExPASy: NiceZyme view
- KEGG: KEGG entry
- MetaCyc: metabolic pathway
- PRIAM: profile
- PDB structures: RCSB PDB PDBe PDBsum
Search
- PMC: articles
- PubMed: articles
- NCBI: proteins

Nitrate reductase (NADH) (EC 1.7.1.1, assimilatory nitrate reductase, NADH-nitrate reductase, NADH-dependent nitrate reductase, assimilatory NADH: nitrate reductase, nitrate reductase (NADH_{2}), NADH_{2}: nitrate oxidoreductase) is an enzyme with systematic name nitrite: NAD^{+} oxidoreductase. This enzyme catalyzes the following chemical reaction

nitrite + NAD^{+} + H_{2}O $\rightleftharpoons$ nitrate + NADH + H^{+}

Nitrate reductase is an iron-sulfur molybdenum flavoprotein.
