= List of MeSH codes (D12.776.124) =

The following is a partial list of the "D" codes for Medical Subject Headings (MeSH), as defined by the United States National Library of Medicine (NLM).

This list covers blood proteins. For other protein-related codes, see List of MeSH codes (D12.776).

Codes before these are found at List of MeSH codes (D12.776.097). Codes following these are found at List of MeSH codes (D12.776.157). For other MeSH codes, see List of MeSH codes.

The source for this content is the set of 2006 MeSH Trees from the NLM.

== MeSH D12.776.124 – blood proteins ==
=== MeSH D12.776.124.050 – acute-phase proteins ===
==== MeSH D12.776.124.050.250 – fibrinogen ====
- MeSH D12.776.124.050.250.265 – fibrinogens, abnormal

=== MeSH D12.776.124.125 – blood coagulation factors ===
==== MeSH D12.776.124.125.300 – factor v ====
- MeSH D12.776.124.125.300.300 – factor va

==== MeSH D12.776.124.125.325 – factor vii ====
- MeSH D12.776.124.125.325.300 – factor viia

==== MeSH D12.776.124.125.350 – factor viii ====
- MeSH D12.776.124.125.350.300 – factor viiia

==== MeSH D12.776.124.125.375 – factor ix ====
- MeSH D12.776.124.125.375.310 – factor ixa

==== MeSH D12.776.124.125.400 – factor x ====
- MeSH D12.776.124.125.400.315 – factor xa

==== MeSH D12.776.124.125.425 – factor xi ====
- MeSH D12.776.124.125.425.320 – factor xia

==== MeSH D12.776.124.125.450 – factor xii ====
- MeSH D12.776.124.125.450.324 – factor xiia

==== MeSH D12.776.124.125.475 – factor xiii ====
- MeSH D12.776.124.125.475.500 – factor xiiia

==== MeSH D12.776.124.125.500 – fibrinogen ====
- MeSH D12.776.124.125.500.265 – fibrinogens, abnormal

==== MeSH D12.776.124.125.597 – kallikreins ====
- MeSH D12.776.124.125.597.712 – prekallikrein

==== MeSH D12.776.124.125.635 – kininogens ====
- MeSH D12.776.124.125.635.480 – kininogen, high-molecular-weight
- MeSH D12.776.124.125.635.490 – kininogen, low-molecular-weight

==== MeSH D12.776.124.125.662 – plasminogen activators ====
- MeSH D12.776.124.125.662.537 – streptokinase
- MeSH D12.776.124.125.662.537.075 – anistreplase
- MeSH D12.776.124.125.662.537.900 – streptodornase and streptokinase
- MeSH D12.776.124.125.662.768 – tissue plasminogen activator
- MeSH D12.776.124.125.662.884 – urinary plasminogen activator

=== MeSH D12.776.124.400 – hemoglobins ===
==== MeSH D12.776.124.400.405 – hemoglobin a ====
- MeSH D12.776.124.400.405.440 – hemoglobin a, glycosylated
- MeSH D12.776.124.400.405.450 – hemoglobin a2

==== MeSH D12.776.124.400.463 – hemoglobins, abnormal ====
- MeSH D12.776.124.400.463.338 – hemoglobin c
- MeSH D12.776.124.400.463.375 – hemoglobin e
- MeSH D12.776.124.400.463.463 – hemoglobin h
- MeSH D12.776.124.400.463.480 – hemoglobin j
- MeSH D12.776.124.400.463.510 – hemoglobin m
- MeSH D12.776.124.400.463.588 – hemoglobin, sickle

=== MeSH D12.776.124.486 – immunoproteins ===
==== MeSH D12.776.124.486.274 – complement system proteins ====
- MeSH D12.776.124.486.274.024 – anaphylatoxins
- MeSH D12.776.124.486.274.024.250 – complement c3a
- MeSH D12.776.124.486.274.024.260 – complement c4a
- MeSH D12.776.124.486.274.024.270 – complement c5a
- MeSH D12.776.124.486.274.024.270.255 – complement c5a, des-arginine
- MeSH D12.776.124.486.274.050 – complement c1
- MeSH D12.776.124.486.274.050.270 – complement c1q
- MeSH D12.776.124.486.274.050.280 – complement c1r
- MeSH D12.776.124.486.274.050.290 – complement c1s
- MeSH D12.776.124.486.274.150 – complement c2
- MeSH D12.776.124.486.274.150.500 – complement c2a
- MeSH D12.776.124.486.274.150.750 – complement c2b
- MeSH D12.776.124.486.274.250 – complement c3
- MeSH D12.776.124.486.274.250.250 – complement c3a
- MeSH D12.776.124.486.274.250.260 – complement c3b
- MeSH D12.776.124.486.274.250.260.500 – complement c3c
- MeSH D12.776.124.486.274.250.260.750 – complement c3d
- MeSH D12.776.124.486.274.350 – complement c4
- MeSH D12.776.124.486.274.350.250 – complement c4a
- MeSH D12.776.124.486.274.350.260 – complement c4b
- MeSH D12.776.124.486.274.450 – complement c5
- MeSH D12.776.124.486.274.450.250 – complement c5a
- MeSH D12.776.124.486.274.450.250.255 – complement c5a, des-arginine
- MeSH D12.776.124.486.274.450.625 – complement c5b
- MeSH D12.776.124.486.274.550 – complement c6
- MeSH D12.776.124.486.274.650 – complement c7
- MeSH D12.776.124.486.274.750 – complement c8
- MeSH D12.776.124.486.274.850 – complement c9
- MeSH D12.776.124.486.274.860 – complement activating enzymes
- MeSH D12.776.124.486.274.860.280 – complement c1r
- MeSH D12.776.124.486.274.860.290 – complement c1s
- MeSH D12.776.124.486.274.860.387 – complement c3-c5 convertases
- MeSH D12.776.124.486.274.860.387.500 – complement c3-c5 convertases, alternative pathway
- MeSH D12.776.124.486.274.860.387.500.374 – complement c3 convertase, alternative pathway
- MeSH D12.776.124.486.274.860.387.500.750 – complement c5 convertase, alternative pathway
- MeSH D12.776.124.486.274.860.387.750 – complement c3-c5 convertases, classical pathway
- MeSH D12.776.124.486.274.860.387.750.500 – complement c3 convertase, classical pathway
- MeSH D12.776.124.486.274.860.387.750.750 – complement c5 convertase, classical pathway
- MeSH D12.776.124.486.274.860.387.875 – mannose-binding protein-associated serine proteases
- MeSH D12.776.124.486.274.860.450 – complement factor d
- MeSH D12.776.124.486.274.900 – complement factor b
- MeSH D12.776.124.486.274.920 – complement inactivator proteins
- MeSH D12.776.124.486.274.920.124 – antigens, cd46
- MeSH D12.776.124.486.274.920.250 – complement c1 inactivator proteins
- MeSH D12.776.124.486.274.920.250.500 – complement c1 inhibitor protein
- MeSH D12.776.124.486.274.920.287 – complement c3 nephritic factor
- MeSH D12.776.124.486.274.920.325 – complement c3b inactivator proteins
- MeSH D12.776.124.486.274.920.325.200 – complement factor h
- MeSH D12.776.124.486.274.920.325.210 – complement factor i
- MeSH D12.776.124.486.274.920.662 – complement c4b-binding protein
- MeSH D12.776.124.486.274.930 – complement membrane attack complex
- MeSH D12.776.124.486.274.965 – properdin

==== MeSH D12.776.124.486.379 – eosinophil granule proteins ====
- MeSH D12.776.124.486.379.249 – eosinophil cationic protein
- MeSH D12.776.124.486.379.275 – eosinophil-derived neurotoxin
- MeSH D12.776.124.486.379.311 – eosinophil peroxidase
- MeSH D12.776.124.486.379.500 – eosinophil major basic protein

==== MeSH D12.776.124.486.485 – immunoglobulins ====
- MeSH D12.776.124.486.485.114 – antibodies
- MeSH D12.776.124.486.485.114.071 – antibodies, anti-idiotypic
- MeSH D12.776.124.486.485.114.089 – antibodies, archaeal
- MeSH D12.776.124.486.485.114.107 – antibodies, bacterial
- MeSH D12.776.124.486.485.114.107.288 – antistreptolysin
- MeSH D12.776.124.486.485.114.125 – antibodies, bispecific
- MeSH D12.776.124.486.485.114.143 – antibodies, blocking
- MeSH D12.776.124.486.485.114.167 – antibodies, catalytic
- MeSH D12.776.124.486.485.114.179 – antibodies, fungal
- MeSH D12.776.124.486.485.114.185 – antibodies, helminth
- MeSH D12.776.124.486.485.114.191 – antibodies, heterophile
- MeSH D12.776.124.486.485.114.224 – antibodies, monoclonal
- MeSH D12.776.124.486.485.114.224.570 – muromonab-cd3
- MeSH D12.776.124.486.485.114.240 – antibodies, neoplasm
- MeSH D12.776.124.486.485.114.248 – antibodies, phospho-specific
- MeSH D12.776.124.486.485.114.252 – antibodies, protozoan
- MeSH D12.776.124.486.485.114.254 – antibodies, viral
- MeSH D12.776.124.486.485.114.254.150 – deltaretrovirus antibodies
- MeSH D12.776.124.486.485.114.254.150.440 – hiv antibodies
- MeSH D12.776.124.486.485.114.254.150.500 – htlv-i antibodies
- MeSH D12.776.124.486.485.114.254.150.510 – htlv-ii antibodies
- MeSH D12.776.124.486.485.114.254.450 – hepatitis antibodies
- MeSH D12.776.124.486.485.114.254.450.251 – hepatitis a antibodies
- MeSH D12.776.124.486.485.114.254.450.504 – hepatitis b antibodies
- MeSH D12.776.124.486.485.114.254.450.510 – hepatitis c antibodies
- MeSH D12.776.124.486.485.114.257 – antigen-antibody complex
- MeSH D12.776.124.486.485.114.301 – antitoxins
- MeSH D12.776.124.486.485.114.301.138 – antivenins
- MeSH D12.776.124.486.485.114.301.268 – botulinum antitoxin
- MeSH D12.776.124.486.485.114.301.438 – diphtheria antitoxin
- MeSH D12.776.124.486.485.114.301.849 – tetanus antitoxin
- MeSH D12.776.124.486.485.114.323 – autoantibodies
- MeSH D12.776.124.486.485.114.323.190 – antibodies, antineutrophil cytoplasmic
- MeSH D12.776.124.486.485.114.323.204 – antibodies, antinuclear
- MeSH D12.776.124.486.485.114.323.210 – antibodies, antiphospholipid
- MeSH D12.776.124.486.485.114.323.210.100 – antibodies, anticardiolipin
- MeSH D12.776.124.486.485.114.323.210.600 – lupus coagulation inhibitor
- MeSH D12.776.124.486.485.114.323.300 – complement c3 nephritic factor
- MeSH D12.776.124.486.485.114.323.390 – immunoconglutinins
- MeSH D12.776.124.486.485.114.323.480 – immunoglobulins, thyroid-stimulating
- MeSH D12.776.124.486.485.114.323.480.500 – long-acting thyroid stimulator
- MeSH D12.776.124.486.485.114.323.732 – rheumatoid factor
- MeSH D12.776.124.486.485.114.345 – binding sites, antibody
- MeSH D12.776.124.486.485.114.345.180 – complementarity determining regions
- MeSH D12.776.124.486.485.114.525 – hemolysins
- MeSH D12.776.124.486.485.114.573 – immune sera
- MeSH D12.776.124.486.485.114.573.203 – antilymphocyte serum
- MeSH D12.776.124.486.485.114.573.601 – antitoxins
- MeSH D12.776.124.486.485.114.573.601.138 – antivenins
- MeSH D12.776.124.486.485.114.573.601.268 – botulinum antitoxin
- MeSH D12.776.124.486.485.114.573.601.438 – diphtheria antitoxin
- MeSH D12.776.124.486.485.114.573.601.849 – tetanus antitoxin
- MeSH D12.776.124.486.485.114.580 – immunoconjugates
- MeSH D12.776.124.486.485.114.580.450 – immunotoxins
- MeSH D12.776.124.486.485.114.606 – immunoglobulin allotypes
- MeSH D12.776.124.486.485.114.606.586 – immunoglobulin gm allotypes
- MeSH D12.776.124.486.485.114.606.587 – immunoglobulin km allotypes
- MeSH D12.776.124.486.485.114.619 – immunoglobulin isotypes
- MeSH D12.776.124.486.485.114.619.026 – immunoglobulin a
- MeSH D12.776.124.486.485.114.619.026.030 – immunoglobulin a, secretory
- MeSH D12.776.124.486.485.114.619.026.030.500 – secretory component
- MeSH D12.776.124.486.485.114.619.026.515 – immunoglobulin alpha-chains
- MeSH D12.776.124.486.485.114.619.251 – immunoglobulin d
- MeSH D12.776.124.486.485.114.619.251.500 – immunoglobulin delta-chains
- MeSH D12.776.124.486.485.114.619.312 – immunoglobulin e
- MeSH D12.776.124.486.485.114.619.312.500 – immunoglobulin epsilon-chains
- MeSH D12.776.124.486.485.114.619.393 – immunoglobulin g
- MeSH D12.776.124.486.485.114.619.393.522 – immunoglobulin gamma-chains
- MeSH D12.776.124.486.485.114.619.393.522.400 – immunoglobulin gm allotypes
- MeSH D12.776.124.486.485.114.619.393.536 – immunoglobulins, intravenous
- MeSH D12.776.124.486.485.114.619.393.550 – long-acting thyroid stimulator
- MeSH D12.776.124.486.485.114.619.393.570 – muromonab-cd3
- MeSH D12.776.124.486.485.114.619.393.700 – rho(d) immune globulin
- MeSH D12.776.124.486.485.114.619.574 – immunoglobulin m
- MeSH D12.776.124.486.485.114.619.574.500 – immunoglobulin mu-chains
- MeSH D12.776.124.486.485.114.632 – immunoglobulins, intravenous
- MeSH D12.776.124.486.485.114.648 – immunoglobulins, thyroid-stimulating
- MeSH D12.776.124.486.485.114.656 – insulin antibodies
- MeSH D12.776.124.486.485.114.664 – isoantibodies
- MeSH D12.776.124.486.485.114.715 – oligoclonal bands
- MeSH D12.776.124.486.485.114.767 – opsonin proteins
- MeSH D12.776.124.486.485.114.820 – plantibodies
- MeSH D12.776.124.486.485.114.837 – precipitins
- MeSH D12.776.124.486.485.114.890 – reagins
- MeSH D12.776.124.486.485.397 – gamma-globulins
- MeSH D12.776.124.486.485.397.500 – tuftsin
- MeSH D12.776.124.486.485.538 – immunoglobulin constant regions
- MeSH D12.776.124.486.485.538.249 – immunoglobulin fab fragments
- MeSH D12.776.124.486.485.538.500 – immunoglobulin fc fragments
- MeSH D12.776.124.486.485.538.500.249 – cd4 immunoadhesins
- MeSH D12.776.124.486.485.680 – immunoglobulin fragments
- MeSH D12.776.124.486.485.680.650 – immunoglobulin fab fragments
- MeSH D12.776.124.486.485.680.650.500 – immunoglobulin variable region
- MeSH D12.776.124.486.485.680.650.500.180 – complementarity determining regions
- MeSH D12.776.124.486.485.680.650.500.590 – immunoglobulin joining region
- MeSH D12.776.124.486.485.680.650.750 – tuftsin
- MeSH D12.776.124.486.485.680.660 – immunoglobulin fc fragments
- MeSH D12.776.124.486.485.680.660.249 – cd4 immunoadhesins
- MeSH D12.776.124.486.485.680.660.500 – immunoglobulin constant regions
- MeSH D12.776.124.486.485.680.745 – immunoglobulin idiotypes
- MeSH D12.776.124.486.485.705 – immunoglobulin subunits
- MeSH D12.776.124.486.485.705.500 – immunoglobulin heavy chains
- MeSH D12.776.124.486.485.705.500.350 – immunoglobulin alpha-chains
- MeSH D12.776.124.486.485.705.500.360 – immunoglobulin delta-chains
- MeSH D12.776.124.486.485.705.500.370 – immunoglobulin epsilon-chains
- MeSH D12.776.124.486.485.705.500.380 – immunoglobulin gamma-chains
- MeSH D12.776.124.486.485.705.500.380.500 – immunoglobulin gm allotypes
- MeSH D12.776.124.486.485.705.500.500 – immunoglobulin mu-chains
- MeSH D12.776.124.486.485.705.625 – immunoglobulin j-chains
- MeSH D12.776.124.486.485.705.750 – immunoglobulin light chains
- MeSH D12.776.124.486.485.705.750.530 – immunoglobulin kappa-chains
- MeSH D12.776.124.486.485.705.750.530.500 – immunoglobulin km allotypes
- MeSH D12.776.124.486.485.705.750.550 – immunoglobulin lambda-chains
- MeSH D12.776.124.486.485.705.875 – secretory component
- MeSH D12.776.124.486.485.797 – immunoglobulin variable region
- MeSH D12.776.124.486.485.797.180 – complementarity determining regions
- MeSH D12.776.124.486.485.797.570 – immunoglobulin fab fragments
- MeSH D12.776.124.486.485.797.590 – immunoglobulin joining region
- MeSH D12.776.124.486.485.900 – paraproteins
- MeSH D12.776.124.486.485.900.120 – bence jones protein
- MeSH D12.776.124.486.485.900.225 – cryoglobulins
- MeSH D12.776.124.486.485.900.500 – myeloma proteins
- MeSH D12.776.124.486.485.900.700 – pyroglobulins
- MeSH D12.776.124.486.485.950 – receptors, antigen, b-cell
- MeSH D12.776.124.486.485.950.500 – antigens, cd79

=== MeSH D12.776.124.790 – serum globulins ===
==== MeSH D12.776.124.790.106 – alpha-globulins ====
- MeSH D12.776.124.790.106.050 – alpha 1-antichymotrypsin
- MeSH D12.776.124.790.106.085 – alpha 1-antitrypsin
- MeSH D12.776.124.790.106.100 – alpha-macroglobulins
- MeSH D12.776.124.790.106.118 – antiplasmin
- MeSH D12.776.124.790.106.125 – antithrombin iii
- MeSH D12.776.124.790.106.214 – ceruloplasmin
- MeSH D12.776.124.790.106.394 – haptoglobins
- MeSH D12.776.124.790.106.450 – heparin cofactor ii
- MeSH D12.776.124.790.106.640 – orosomucoid
- MeSH D12.776.124.790.106.740 – progesterone-binding globulin
- MeSH D12.776.124.790.106.750 – retinol-binding proteins
- MeSH D12.776.124.790.106.901 – transcortin

==== MeSH D12.776.124.790.223 – beta-globulins ====
- MeSH D12.776.124.790.223.100 – beta-2 microglobulin
- MeSH D12.776.124.790.223.160 – beta-thromboglobulin
- MeSH D12.776.124.790.223.200 – complement factor h
- MeSH D12.776.124.790.223.338 – hemopexin
- MeSH D12.776.124.790.223.580 – plasminogen
- MeSH D12.776.124.790.223.580.500 – angiostatins
- MeSH D12.776.124.790.223.624 – properdin
- MeSH D12.776.124.790.223.800 – sex hormone-binding globulin
- MeSH D12.776.124.790.223.839 – transferrin

==== MeSH D12.776.124.790.651 – immunoglobulins ====
===== MeSH D12.776.124.790.651.114 – antibodies =====
- MeSH D12.776.124.790.651.114.071 – antibodies, anti-idiotypic
- MeSH D12.776.124.790.651.114.107 – antibodies, archaeal
- MeSH D12.776.124.790.651.114.125 – antibodies, bacterial
- MeSH D12.776.124.790.651.114.125.288 – antistreptolysin
- MeSH D12.776.124.790.651.114.134 – antibodies, bispecific
- MeSH D12.776.124.790.651.114.143 – antibodies, blocking
- MeSH D12.776.124.790.651.114.167 – antibodies, catalytic
- MeSH D12.776.124.790.651.114.179 – antibodies, fungal
- MeSH D12.776.124.790.651.114.185 – antibodies, helminth
- MeSH D12.776.124.790.651.114.191 – antibodies, heterophile
- MeSH D12.776.124.790.651.114.224 – antibodies, monoclonal
- MeSH D12.776.124.790.651.114.224.570 – muromonab-cd3
- MeSH D12.776.124.790.651.114.240 – antibodies, neoplasm
- MeSH D12.776.124.790.651.114.248 – antibodies, phospho-specific
- MeSH D12.776.124.790.651.114.252 – antibodies, protozoan
- MeSH D12.776.124.790.651.114.254 – antibodies, viral
- MeSH D12.776.124.790.651.114.254.150 – deltaretrovirus antibodies
- MeSH D12.776.124.790.651.114.254.150.440 – hiv antibodies
- MeSH D12.776.124.790.651.114.254.150.500 – htlv-i antibodies
- MeSH D12.776.124.790.651.114.254.150.510 – htlv-ii antibodies
- MeSH D12.776.124.790.651.114.254.450 – hepatitis antibodies
- MeSH D12.776.124.790.651.114.254.450.251 – hepatitis a antibodies
- MeSH D12.776.124.790.651.114.254.450.504 – hepatitis b antibodies
- MeSH D12.776.124.790.651.114.254.450.510 – hepatitis c antibodies
- MeSH D12.776.124.790.651.114.257 – antigen-antibody complex
- MeSH D12.776.124.790.651.114.301 – antitoxins
- MeSH D12.776.124.790.651.114.301.138 – antivenins
- MeSH D12.776.124.790.651.114.301.268 – botulinum antitoxin
- MeSH D12.776.124.790.651.114.301.438 – diphtheria antitoxin
- MeSH D12.776.124.790.651.114.301.849 – tetanus antitoxin
- MeSH D12.776.124.790.651.114.323 – autoantibodies
- MeSH D12.776.124.790.651.114.323.190 – antibodies, antineutrophil cytoplasmic
- MeSH D12.776.124.790.651.114.323.204 – antibodies, antinuclear
- MeSH D12.776.124.790.651.114.323.210 – antibodies, antiphospholipid
- MeSH D12.776.124.790.651.114.323.210.100 – antibodies, anticardiolipin
- MeSH D12.776.124.790.651.114.323.210.600 – lupus coagulation inhibitor
- MeSH D12.776.124.790.651.114.323.300 – complement c3 nephritic factor
- MeSH D12.776.124.790.651.114.323.390 – immunoconglutinins
- MeSH D12.776.124.790.651.114.323.480 – immunoglobulins, thyroid-stimulating
- MeSH D12.776.124.790.651.114.323.480.500 – long-acting thyroid stimulator
- MeSH D12.776.124.790.651.114.323.732 – rheumatoid factor
- MeSH D12.776.124.790.651.114.345 – binding sites, antibody
- MeSH D12.776.124.790.651.114.345.180 – complementarity determining regions
- MeSH D12.776.124.790.651.114.525 – hemolysins
- MeSH D12.776.124.790.651.114.573 – immune sera
- MeSH D12.776.124.790.651.114.573.203 – antilymphocyte serum
- MeSH D12.776.124.790.651.114.580 – immunoconjugates
- MeSH D12.776.124.790.651.114.580.450 – immunotoxins
- MeSH D12.776.124.790.651.114.606 – immunoglobulin allotypes
- MeSH D12.776.124.790.651.114.606.586 – immunoglobulin gm allotypes
- MeSH D12.776.124.790.651.114.606.587 – immunoglobulin km allotypes
- MeSH D12.776.124.790.651.114.619 – immunoglobulin isotypes
- MeSH D12.776.124.790.651.114.619.026 – immunoglobulin a
- MeSH D12.776.124.790.651.114.619.026.030 – immunoglobulin a, secretory
- MeSH D12.776.124.790.651.114.619.026.030.500 – secretory component
- MeSH D12.776.124.790.651.114.619.026.515 – immunoglobulin alpha-chains
- MeSH D12.776.124.790.651.114.619.251 – immunoglobulin d
- MeSH D12.776.124.790.651.114.619.251.500 – immunoglobulin delta-chains
- MeSH D12.776.124.790.651.114.619.312 – immunoglobulin e
- MeSH D12.776.124.790.651.114.619.312.500 – immunoglobulin epsilon-chains
- MeSH D12.776.124.790.651.114.619.393 – immunoglobulin g
- MeSH D12.776.124.790.651.114.619.393.522 – immunoglobulin gamma-chains
- MeSH D12.776.124.790.651.114.619.393.522.400 – immunoglobulin gm allotypes
- MeSH D12.776.124.790.651.114.619.393.550 – long-acting thyroid stimulator
- MeSH D12.776.124.790.651.114.619.393.570 – muromonab-cd3
- MeSH D12.776.124.790.651.114.619.393.700 – rho(d) immune globulin
- MeSH D12.776.124.790.651.114.619.574 – immunoglobulin m
- MeSH D12.776.124.790.651.114.619.574.500 – immunoglobulin mu-chains
- MeSH D12.776.124.790.651.114.632 – immunoglobulins, intravenous
- MeSH D12.776.124.790.651.114.648 – immunoglobulins, thyroid-stimulating
- MeSH D12.776.124.790.651.114.656 – insulin antibodies
- MeSH D12.776.124.790.651.114.664 – isoantibodies
- MeSH D12.776.124.790.651.114.715 – oligoclonal bands
- MeSH D12.776.124.790.651.114.767 – opsonin proteins
- MeSH D12.776.124.790.651.114.820 – plantibodies
- MeSH D12.776.124.790.651.114.837 – precipitins
- MeSH D12.776.124.790.651.114.890 – reagins

===== MeSH D12.776.124.790.651.397 – gamma-globulins =====
- MeSH D12.776.124.790.651.397.500 – tuftsin

===== MeSH D12.776.124.790.651.538 – immunoglobulin constant regions =====
- MeSH D12.776.124.790.651.538.249 – immunoglobulin fab fragments
- MeSH D12.776.124.790.651.538.500 – immunoglobulin fc fragments
- MeSH D12.776.124.790.651.538.500.249 – cd4 immunoadhesins

===== MeSH D12.776.124.790.651.680 – immunoglobulin fragments =====
- MeSH D12.776.124.790.651.680.650 – immunoglobulin fab fragments
- MeSH D12.776.124.790.651.680.650.500 – immunoglobulin variable region
- MeSH D12.776.124.790.651.680.650.500.180 – complementarity determining regions
- MeSH D12.776.124.790.651.680.650.500.590 – immunoglobulin joining region
- MeSH D12.776.124.790.651.680.650.750 – tuftsin
- MeSH D12.776.124.790.651.680.660 – immunoglobulin fc fragments
- MeSH D12.776.124.790.651.680.660.249 – cd4 immunoadhesins
- MeSH D12.776.124.790.651.680.660.500 – immunoglobulin constant regions
- MeSH D12.776.124.790.651.680.745 – immunoglobulin idiotypes

===== MeSH D12.776.124.790.651.705 – immunoglobulin subunits =====
- MeSH D12.776.124.790.651.705.500 – immunoglobulin heavy chains
- MeSH D12.776.124.790.651.705.500.350 – immunoglobulin alpha-chains
- MeSH D12.776.124.790.651.705.500.360 – immunoglobulin delta-chains
- MeSH D12.776.124.790.651.705.500.370 – immunoglobulin epsilon-chains
- MeSH D12.776.124.790.651.705.500.380 – immunoglobulin gamma-chains
- MeSH D12.776.124.790.651.705.500.380.500 – immunoglobulin gm allotypes
- MeSH D12.776.124.790.651.705.500.500 – immunoglobulin mu-chains
- MeSH D12.776.124.790.651.705.625 – immunoglobulin j-chains
- MeSH D12.776.124.790.651.705.750 – immunoglobulin light chains
- MeSH D12.776.124.790.651.705.750.530 – immunoglobulin kappa-chains
- MeSH D12.776.124.790.651.705.750.530.500 – immunoglobulin km allotypes
- MeSH D12.776.124.790.651.705.750.550 – immunoglobulin lambda-chains
- MeSH D12.776.124.790.651.705.875 – secretory component

===== MeSH D12.776.124.790.651.797 – immunoglobulin variable region =====
- MeSH D12.776.124.790.651.797.180 – complementarity determining regions
- MeSH D12.776.124.790.651.797.570 – immunoglobulin fab fragments
- MeSH D12.776.124.790.651.797.590 – immunoglobulin joining region

===== MeSH D12.776.124.790.651.900 – paraproteins =====
- MeSH D12.776.124.790.651.900.120 – bence jones protein
- MeSH D12.776.124.790.651.900.225 – cryoglobulins
- MeSH D12.776.124.790.651.900.500 – myeloma proteins
- MeSH D12.776.124.790.651.900.700 – pyroglobulins

===== MeSH D12.776.124.790.651.950 – receptors, antigen, b-cell =====
- MeSH D12.776.124.790.651.950.500 – antigens, cd79

==== MeSH D12.776.124.790.720 – macroglobulins ====
- MeSH D12.776.124.790.720.100 – alpha-macroglobulins
- MeSH D12.776.124.790.720.100.500 – pregnancy-associated alpha 2-macroglobulins

=== MeSH D12.776.124.920 – vitronectin ===
The list continues at List of MeSH codes (D12.776.157).
