= Recombinant antibodies =

Types of antibody fragment

Recombinant antibodies are antibody fragments produced by using recombinant antibody coding genes. They mostly consist of a heavy and light chain of the variable region of immunoglobulin. Recombinant antibodies have many advantages in both medical and research applications, which make them a popular subject of exploration and new production against specific targets. The most commonly used form is the single chain variable fragment (scFv), which has shown the most promising traits exploitable in human medicine and research. In contrast to monoclonal antibodies produced by hybridoma technology, which may lose the capacity to produce the desired antibody over time, or the antibody may undergo unwanted changes that affect its functionality, recombinant antibodies produced in phage display maintain a high standard of specificity and low immunogenicity.

== Structure and characterization ==
=== Formats ===
There are several known formats of recombinant antibodies which are commonly produced. These are the Fab recombinant antibodies, scFv and diabodies. Each of the formats has a slightly different potential in applications and may be used in various fields of research as well as human and animal medicine. Another researched possibility is the development of anti-idiotypic antibodies. Anti-idiotypic antibodies bind to a paratope of another specific antibody. Therefore, it can be used for measuring presence of antibodies and drug loads in patients' sera. Based on their binding specificity 3 types of anti-idiotypic antibodies can be distinguished, which partially overlap with the previously mentioned formats: the classical ones, a group including Fab fragment antibodies, antibodies binding to idiotope outside of the drug binding site and antibodies, which only bind to the already assembled complex of drug bound to the target. The most commonly used are the scFv, Fab fragments and bispecific antibodies.

==== Single chain variable fragment (scFv) ====
scFv is the smallest of the recombinant antibody formats, which is capable of antigen binding. They have a molecular weight of approximately 27kDa. They are formed by light and heavy chain of the variable region of an immunoglobulin. The two chains are linked by a flexible peptide linker. The flexible peptide linker usually consists of short sequence repetition. The sequence is made up of four glycines and a serine and it serves the purpose of stabilization of the fragment. The functionality may be enhanced by site-specific chemical modifications, adding a peptide-tag or by fusion with a gene to achieve production of bifunctional recombinant antibodies. It is important to establish the binding activity in order to ensure good functionality of the product. To determine the binding activity, ELISA assay is routinely performed.

==== Fab fragments ====
Structurally Fab fragments consist of two sets of variable and constant components, which create two polypetide chains. Together they form a stable structure. As a member of the anti-idiotypic antibodies, Fab fragment recombinant antibodies bind directly to the paratope of the target antibody. That means that they compete with the drug for binding site and have an inhibitory function. Fab fragment antibodies can be used for detection of not bound drugs or free drugs in the serum. Fab antibodies have also been used to avoid the adverse effects caused by unspecific binding of the Fc portion of the antibody, which is missing in the Fab fragment. In case the IgG immunoglobulin was more suitable for the treatment or some other particular application, experiments have also been conducted, in which the recombinant Fab fragments were converted into recombinant IgG form. This possibility further broadens the pool of potential target structures.

==== Bispecific recombinant antibodies ====
Along scFv and Fab fragments, diabodies or bispecific recombinant antibodies are the third major format. Bispecific antibodies combine two different antigen binding specificities within one molecule. The bispecific antibodies are used to crosslink the target molecules with two different cells and mediate direct cytotoxicity.

== Production and development ==
=== Production of recombinant antibodies ===
The production of recombinant antibodies follows principally similar workflow. It consists of determining the sequence of the desired product followed by refinement of the codon, then gene synthesis and construct generation. Once the construct is delivered to the laboratory, expression constructs are produced, then they are transferred to a cell culture in the process called transfection and once the cell culture produces the desired recombinant antibody, it is regularly collected, purified and analyzed or used for further experimentation. For recombinant antibody production the stable cell lines such as CHO and HEK293 are used. Optimizations of mammalian cell cultures have led to increase the yield of antibodies from HEK293 or CHO cell lines to over 12g/liter. In the beginning phases of the recombinant antibody production it was important to achieve the assembly of a functional Fv fragment in Escherichia coli. The correct fold is essential for functionality of the antibody. Second essential prerequisite for the modern day production of scFv was the successful assembly of recombinant antibodies from heavy and light chain of immunoglobulin. These two experiments allowed for further development and refinement of the recombinant antibodies until modern day form. Today's in vitro production process eliminates the need for laboratory animals. Using a synthetic or human Ab library, as opposed to immunization of animals and the subsequent generation of stable hybridoma cell lines, requires fewer resources and produces less waste, making the entire process more sustainable.

==== Hybridoma ====
Monoclonal antibodies are essential for many therapies applied today in human medicine. The first successful technology which was robust and led to a stable production of desired antibodies was hybridoma technology. The hybridoma cell lines, which produced large quantities of relatively pure and predictable antibodies was first introduced in 1975. Since then, it has been used for various purposes scaling from diagnostic and therapeutic to research applications. Despite its indisputable role in scientific discoveries and numerous treatment strategies, the hybridoma technology presents researchers with some obstacles such as ethical issues, potential to lose expression of the target protein or lengthy production and most importantly the development of HAMA in patients as mentioned previously. Therefore, different methods need to complement or even partially replace the hybridoma. Hybridomas are an essential part of the recombinant antibody generation even today as they are still used to produce the monoclonal antibodies, from which the Fab fragments, scFv or somatically fused antibodies create a bispecific antibody.

==== Phage display ====
The most commonly applied technology to produce recombinant antibodies in the laboratory settings today is the phage display. Phage display is a method, in which the target recombinant antibody is produced on the surface of a bacteriophage. This allows for a fast recombinant antibody production and easy manipulation in the laboratory conditions. Both scFv and Fab fragment recombinant antibodies are routinely produced using the antibody phage display. From all the possible phage display systems, the most common is the Escherichia coli, due to its rapid growth and division rate and cheap set up and maintenance.

=== Engineering and development ===
Two main strategies have been described to engineer the scFv fragments. The first one is the so-called non-colinear approach. It works on the principle of heterodimerization of two chains. Non-colinear approach leads to production of diabodies and recombinant antibodies, which combine two specificities. The second approach is called colinear and it described the process of fusion of two different scFv with a biologically active protein.

== Medical and research applications ==
Recombinant antibodies fulfill a large spectrum of functions spanning from research to diagnosis and treatment therapies for various diseases. Their specificity and low immunogenicity make them a great alternative to traditional forms of treatment, increasing the accuracy of targeting specific molecules and avoiding adverse side effects.

Recombinant antibodies have been explored as a treatment for cancer, HIV, herpes simplex virus (HSV) and more. ScFv have been a part of the highly promising therapeutic approach of universal chimeric antigen receptors (uniCAR) technology, which shows promising results. The scFv are part of the technology in the form of target modules, which direct the immune response to specific cancer cells, expressing the target antigen. In case of research into HIV treatment, the recombinant antibodies are rather used for their neutralizing quality. The same goes for HSV infection. Specific recombinant antibodies are designed to bind with to surface heparin sulphate proteoglycan (HSP), which complicates or even disables the entry of the HSV into the host cell. This is a method which significantly decreases the severity of HSV infection.

As was mentioned in the beginning of this section, recombinant antibodies can also be used in diagnosis, an example of such diagnostic application is the detection of rabies virus. Since the current diagnostic antibodies are not as accurate as would be desired, the recombinant antibodies offer a promising alternative. In case of rabies infection, which is only treatable shortly after exposure, accurate and precise diagnosis is vital for survival of the patient. In comparison to commercially produced and commonly available antibodies, the recombinant antibodies are cheaper to produce and more accurate in determining the infection. Another advantage of the recombinant antibody is the potential application as a neutralizing antibody as part of the subsequent treatment.

The potential of recombinant antibodies in human and animal medicine is immense as shown even by the few selected examples. As mentioned previously the recombinant antibodies and especially those, which have been developed in phage display are highly specific, have great pharmacokinetics and could be used in wide range of treatments. However, it is important to realize that it is not expected or desired for the recombinant antibodies created in phage display to completely replace the hybridoma antibody production but rather to complement it.

== Advantages of using recombinant antibodies ==
Recombinant antibodies bring many advantages with their application in human medicine and research. The first one is the complete elimination of ethical issues because there is no need for animal immunization. The cultivation of CHO cells for recombinant antibody expression is a popular strategy for antibody producers since the cell structure is similar to that of the human body. Thanks to their size, which is smaller than complete antibody and particularly than 2000 nm, yet not smaller than 8 nm they are cleared from the organism with ease and in a timely manner, through the renal pathway, which is the desirable clearance. Another great advantage is their monovalency, which means that they are highly specific and bind to a single antigen. Researchers have managed to produce antibodies carrying no other activity than the antigen binding. Since the recombinant antibodies are sequence defined they are more reliable as well as reproducible. In combination with their small size the great specificity can be exploited to deliver highly specific drug to a specific site precisely because the small size predisposes the recombinant antibodies to penetrate tissues more easily. It has been reported that the recombinant antibodies penetrate tumor tissue better than the full-length IgG immunoglobulins. The small size also adds to better biodistribution in the patient. In comparison to antibodies derived from hybridoma cell lines the recombinant antibodies do not cause immunogenicity, the infamous human anti-mouse antibody (HAMA). Further advantages show afucosylated recombinant antibodies which are used successfully in the fight against cancer.

These were the top advantages for use in patients. However, the use of recombinant antibodies is also advantageous compared to traditional monoclonal antibodies derived from hybridoma cell lines during their production as well. The production is much faster and we have better control over the process than in hybridoma technology. Moreover, the recombinant antibodies may be designed virtually against any antigen, of the proper size and shape, but they are not solely limited to the peptide nature of an antigen. The recombinant antibodies may also be used in fused form with drugs and/or toxins, which may be further exploited in the medical applications. Last but not least of their advantages during production is the possibility to optimize and genetically engineer the recombinant antibodies based on the current demand of the patient or researcher. An experienced technician is required to perform the phage display and third it is almost inevitable to include outsource companies in the process for the gene synthesis and construct generation. However, in a systematic comparison of animal derived antibodies verus phage display derived recombinant antibodies used for research and diagnostic applications, the EU Reference Laboratory for Alternatives to Animal Testing (EURL ECVAM) released a recommendation in favor of on non-animal derived antibodies in May 2020, mainly based on the fact that in contrast to animal derived antibodies, recombinant antibodies are always sequence defined protein reagents, allowing to eliminate some of the quality issues attributed to current research antibodies when made in animals.
