= Antibody Solutions =

American contract research organization

- Company type: Private company
- Industry: Biotechnology
- Headquarters: Santa Clara, CA, USA
- Services: Antibody development, contract outsourcing
- Website: https://www.antibody.com/

Antibody Solutions is a privately held American contract research organization headquartered in Santa Clara, California. It provides research and discovery services and fit-for-purpose antibodies to biopharmaceutical and diagnostic companies and academic researchers worldwide. The company’s services include monoclonal and polyclonal antibody and antigen development, molecular modeling, antibody sequencing and engineering, bioreactor technology, pharmacokinetic studies, antibody epitope binning, peptide synthesis, immunoassay development, ligand-binding assay analysis, and support for CAR-T research.

== History ==
Antibody Solutions was founded in 1995 by current president, John Kenney, PhD, Judith Lynch-Kenney, and Dennis and Bette Gould. Dr. Kenney previously managed the monoclonal antibody (MAb) development laboratory for Syntex Research (Roche) in Palo Alto, while Gould managed the MAb production facility for Syva Diagnostics. Gould left Antibody Solutions in 1997, eventually becoming a vice president for Sepragen Corporation. Kenney and Gould were assisted in the startup of the company by Barry Bredt, who had the foresight to acquire the domain name, www.antibody.com, for the company. Bredt later became director of the University of California at San Francisco’s General Clinical Research Center, and was a pioneer of the HIV/AIDS Diagnostics EasyCD4; he died on April 8, 2007.

Antibody Solutions was incorporated in 1998 with Dr. Kenney as president and Judith Lynch-Kenney as chief financial officer. One of the first independent antibody discovery companies, the firm focused on custom antibody discovery for therapeutics, diagnostics and critical reagents. The company pioneered the use of bioreactors in antibody research by becoming the first CRO to produce antibodies in CELLine flasks in 2000.

From 2004 to 2011, Antibody Solutions was headquartered in Mountain View, a short distance from Shoreline Park, Moffett Field and the Googleplex. In 2011, the company moved to new facilities in Sunnyvale. It moved to its current 33,300-square-foot location at 3033 Scott Blvd. in Santa Clara near the San Tomas Expressway in mid-2019. A grand opening for the Scott Blvd. facility was held on January 30, 2020, to coincide with the company's Silver Anniversary.

== Partnerships ==
Over the years, Antibody Solutions has had strategic agreements with a range of life science companies, including Open Monoclonal Technology, Inc. (OMT), Reflexion Pharmaceuticals, Guava Technologies, Single-Cell Technologies, Trianni, Harbour Antibodies, OmniAb and Alloy Therapeutics.

== Research ==
Independent research conducted by Antibody Solutions and published or presented at scientific conferences include the following:

- Generation of Neutralizing Human Monoclonal Antibodies Against a Therapeutic Target from the Alloy Therapeutics Mouse
- Generation Using a Molecular Modeling Platform to Guide Therapeutic Antibody Discovery
- Optimization of Therapeutic Discovery Strategies for Human Antibody Transgenic Animal Platforms
- Development of Antibody and PK, and ADA Assays for a Cystine Knot Fusion Protein
- A Rapid, High-Throughput Recombinant Antibody Expression System for Therapeutic Antibody Discovery and Validation
- Generation of Agonist and Antagonist Human Monoclonal Antibodies Against an Immune Checkpoint Target from the H2L2 Mouse
- Generation and Selection of Human Monoclonal Antibodies from the OmniRat
- Therapeutic Antibody Discovery at Antibody Solutions using the OmniAb Platform
- Development of human antibodies to human vascular endothelial growth factor -C (VEGF-C) and -D (VEGF-D)
- Obtaining Antibodies to Difficult Membrane Targets through DNA and Cell Immunization
- Next-Generation Therapeutic Antibody Discovery from Single B-cells
- Generation and Selection of Human Monoclonal Antibodies from the H2L2 Mouse
- Generation of Antibodies to Difficult Membrane Protein Targets
- Development of Antibodies and ELISAs to measure Free and Total Obiltoxaximab (ETI-204) in the Presence of Anthrax Protective Antigen PA63
- Discovery of Therapeutic Antibodies to Difficult Membrane Proteins

== Products and services ==
- Therapeutic antibody discovery
- Cell-receptor monoclonal antibody development
- In vivo animal study-grade antibodies development
- Molecular modeling
- Antibody sequencing
- Anti-idiotype antibody production
- Anti-protein antibodies for pharmacokinetics studies
- Immunogenicity assays for reagents and controls
- Immunoassay development
- Ligand-binding assay analysis
- Drug potency assay analysis
- Cell bank storage
- Full technical and project management
