= Immune network theory =

The immune network theory is a theory of how the adaptive immune system works, that has been developed since 1974 mainly by Niels Jerne and Geoffrey W. Hoffmann. The theory states that the immune system is an interacting network of lymphocytes and molecules that have variable (V) regions. These V regions bind not only to things that are foreign to the vertebrate, but also to other V regions within the system. The immune system is therefore seen as a network, with the components connected to each other by V-V interactions.

It has been suggested that the phenomena that the theory describes in terms of networks are also explained by clonal selection theory.

The scope of the symmetrical network theory developed by Hoffmann includes the phenomena of low dose and high dose tolerance, first reported for a single antigen by Avrion Mitchison, and confirmed by Geoffrey Shellam and Sir Gustav Nossal, the helper and suppressor roles of T cells, the role of non-specific accessory cells in immune responses, and the very important phenomenon called I-J. Jerne was awarded the Nobel Prize for Medicine or Physiology in 1984 partly for his work towards the clonal selection theory, as well as his proposal of the immune network concept.

The immune network theory has also inspired a subfield of optimization algorithms similar to artificial neural networks.

== The symmetrical immune network theory ==
Heinz Kohler was involved in early idiotypic network research and was the first to suggest that idiotypic network interactions are symmetrical. He developed a detailed immune network theory based on symmetrical stimulatory, inhibitory and killing interactions. It offers a framework for understanding a large number of immunological phenomena based on a small number of postulates. The theory involves roles for B cells that make antibodies, T cells that regulate the production of antibodies by B cells, and non-specific accessory cells (A cells).

Antibodies called IgG have two V regions and a molecular weight of 150,000. A central role in the theory is played by specific T cell factors, which have a molecular weight of approximately 50,000, and are postulated in the theory to have only one V region. Hoffmann has proposed that for brevity specific T cell factors should be called tabs. Tabs are able to exert a powerful suppressive effect on the production of IgG antibodies in response to foreign substances (antigens), as was demonstrated rigorously by Takemori and Tada. Hoffmann and Gorczynski have reproduced the Takemori and Tada experiment, confirming the existence of specific T cell factors. In the symmetrical network theory tabs are able to block V regions and also to have a stimulatory role when bound to a tab receptor on A cells. Symmetrical stimulatory interactions follow from the postulate that activation of B cells, T cells and A cells involves cross-linking of receptors.

The symmetrical network theory has been developed with the assistance of mathematical modeling. In order to exhibit immune memory to any combination of a large number of different pathogens, the system has a large number of stable steady states. The system is also able to switch between steady states as has been observed experimentally. For example, low or high doses of an antigen can cause the system to switch to a suppressed state for the antigen, while intermediate doses can cause the induction of immunity.

== I-J, the I-J paradox, and a resolution of the I-J paradox ==
The theory accounts for the ability of T cells to have regulatory roles in both helping and suppressing immune responses. In 1976 Murphy et al. and Tada et al. independently reported a phenomenon in mice called I-J. From the perspective of the symmetrical network theory, I-J is one of the most important phenomena in immunology, while for many immunologists who are not familiar with the details of the theory, I-J "does not exist". In practice I-J is defined by anti-I-J antibodies, that are produced when mice of certain strains are immunized with tissue of certain other strains; see Murphy et al. and Tada et al., op cit. I-J was found by these authors to map to within the Major Histocompatibility Complex, but no gene could be found at the site where I-J had been mapped in numerous experiments. The absence of I-J gene(s) within the MHC at the place where I-J had been mapped became known as the "I-J paradox". This paradox resulted in regulatory T cells and tabs, which both express I-J determinants, falling out of favour, together with the symmetrical network theory, that is based on the existence of tabs. In the meantime however, it has been shown that the I-J paradox can be resolved in the context of the symmetrical network theory.

The resolution of the I-J paradox involves a process of mutual selection (or "co-selection") of regulatory T cells and helper T cells, meaning that (a) those regulatory T cells are selected that have V regions with complementarity to as many helper T cells as possible, and (b) helper T cells are selected not only on the basis of their V regions having some affinity for MHC class II, but also on the basis of the V regions having some affinity for the selected regulatory T cell V regions. The helper T cells and regulatory T cells that are co-selected are then a mutually stabilizing construct, and for a given mouse genome, more than one such mutually stabilizing set can exist. This resolution of the I-J paradox leads to some testable predictions.

However, considering the importance of the (unfound) I-J determinant for the theory, the I-J paradox solution is still subject to strong criticism, e.g.Falsifiability.

== Relevance for understanding HIV pathogenesis ==
An immune network model for HIV pathogenesis was published in 1994 postulating that HIV-specific T cells are preferentially infected (Hoffmann, 1994, op cit.). The publication of this paper was followed in 2002 with the publication of a paper entitled "HIV preferentially infects HIV specific CD4+ T cells."

Under the immune network theory, the main cause for progression to AIDS after HIV infection is not the direct killing of infected T helper cells by the virus. Following an infection with HIV that manages to establish itself, there is a complex interaction between the HIV virus, the T helper cells that it infects, and regulatory T cells. These three quasispecies apply selective pressure on one another and co-evolve in such a way that the viral epitopes eventually come to mimick the V regions of the main population of T regulatory cells. Once this happens, anti-HIV antibodies can bind to and kill most of the host's T regulatory cell population. This results in the dysregulation of the immune system, and eventually to other further anti-self reactions, including against the T helper cell population. At that point, the adaptive immune system is completely compromised and AIDS ensues. Hence in this model, the onset of AIDS is primarily an auto-immune reaction triggered by the cross-reaction of anti-HIV antibodies with T regulatory cells. Once this induced auto-immunity sets in, removing the HIV virus itself (for instance via HAART) would not be sufficient to restore proper immune function. The co-evolution of the quasispecies mentioned above will take a variable time depending on the initial conditions at the time of infection (i.e. the epitopes of the first infection and the steady state of the host's immune cell population), which would explain why there is a variable period, which differs greatly between individual patients, between HIV infection and the onset of AIDS. It also suggests that conventional vaccines are unlikely to be successful, since they would not prevent the auto-immune reaction. In fact such vaccines may do more harm in certain cases, since if the original infection comes from a source with a "mature" infection, those virions will have a high affinity for anti-HIV T helper cells (see above), and so increasing the anti-HIV population via vaccination only serves to provide the virus with more easy targets.

== An HIV vaccine concept based on immune network theory ==
A hypothetical HIV vaccine concept based on immune network theory has been described. The vaccine concept was based on a network theory resolution of the Oudin-Cazenave paradox. This is a phenomenon that makes no sense in the context of clonal selection, without taking idiotypic network interactions into account. The vaccine concept comprised complexes of an anti-anti-HIV antibody and an HIV antigen, and was designed to induce the production of broadly neutralizing anti-HIV antibodies. A suitable anti-anti-HIV antibody envisaged for use in this vaccine is the monoclonal antibody 1F7, which was discovered by Sybille Muller and Heinz Kohler and their colleagues. This monoclonal antibody binds to all of six well characterized broadly neutralizing anti-HIV antibodies.

== A more general vaccine based on immune network theory ==
A vaccine concept based on a more recent extension of immune network theory and also based on much more data has been described by Reginald Gorczynski and Geoffrey W. Hoffmann. The vaccine typically involves three immune systems, A, B and C that can be combined to make an exceptionally strong immune system in a treated vertebrate C. In mouse models the vaccine has been shown to be effective in the prevention of inflammatory bowel disease; the prevention of tumour growth and prevention of metastases in a transplantable breast cancer; and in the treatment of an allergy. The immune system of C is stimulated by a combination of A anti-B (antigen-specific) and B anti-anti-B (antiidiotypic) antibodies. The former stimulate anti-anti-B T cells and the latter stimulate anti-B T cells within C. Mutual selection ("co-selection") of the anti-B and anti-anti-B T cells takes the system to a new stable steady state in which there are elevated levels of these two populations of T cells. An untreated vertebrate C with self antigens denoted C is believed to have a one-dimensional axis of lymphocytes that is defined by co-selection of anti-C and anti-anti-C lymphocytes. The treated vertebrate C has a two dimensional system of lymphocytes defined by co-selection of both anti-C and anti-anti-C lymphocytes and co-selection of anti-B and anti-anti-B lymphocytes. Experiments indicate that the two-dimensional system is more stable than the one-dimensional system.
