= List of MeSH codes (D12.776.097) =

The following is a partial list of the "D" codes for Medical Subject Headings (MeSH), as defined by the United States National Library of Medicine (NLM).

This list covers bacterial proteins. For other protein-related codes, see List of MeSH codes (D12.776).

Codes before these are found at List of MeSH codes (D12.776) § MeSH D12.776.093. Codes following these are found at List of MeSH codes (D12.776.124). For other MeSH codes, see List of MeSH codes.

The source for this content is the set of 2006 MeSH Trees from the NLM.

== MeSH D12.776.097 – bacterial proteins ==
=== MeSH D12.776.097.120 – bacterial outer membrane proteins ===
==== MeSH D12.776.097.120.050 – adhesins, bacterial ====
- MeSH D12.776.097.120.050.040 – adhesins, escherichia coli

==== MeSH D12.776.097.120.300 – bacterial transferrin receptor complex ====
- MeSH D12.776.097.120.300.500 – transferrin-binding protein a
- MeSH D12.776.097.120.300.750 – transferrin-binding protein b

=== MeSH D12.776.097.910 – zinostatin ===
The list continues at List of MeSH codes (D12.776.124).
