= Racotumomab =

Monoclonal antibody
- Type: Whole antibody
- Source: Mouse
- Target: NGNA ganglioside

Clinical data
- Trade names: Vaxira
- ATC code: none

Identifiers
- CAS Number: 946832-34-4
- ChemSpider: none
- UNII: 52G405U1E5

Chemical and physical data
- Formula: C_{6476}H_{9922}N_{1712}O_{2048}S_{50}
- Molar mass: 146133.55 g·mol^{−1}

Racotumomab (trade name Vaxira) is a therapeutic cancer vaccine for the treatment of solid tumors that is currently under clinical development by ReComBio (R and Research in Computational Biology), an international public-private consortium with the participation of the Center of Molecular Immunology at Havana, Cuba (CIM) and researchers from Buenos Aires University and National University of Quilmes in Argentina. It induces the patient's immune system to generate a response against a cancer-specific molecular target with the purpose of blocking tumor growth, slowing disease progression and ultimately increasing patient survival.

Racotumomab triggers an immune response against the tumor antigen N-glycolyl (NGc) GM3 (NGcGM3), a type of ganglioside present on the cell surface of malignant cells from lung and breast, melanoma, as well as neuroectodermal pediatric tumors. Racotumomab has successfully completed a proof-of concept clinical trial in advanced non-small cell lung cancer (NSCLC) and is currently being tested in a large, multinational study for the same indication.

Racotumomab has been approved in two countries, Argentina and Cuba, for the treatment of recurrent or advanced NSCLC, or NSCLC independent of the disease stage when no other standard therapy can be administered.

== Medical uses ==
Racotumomab is administered in patients who have previously received the oncospecific treatment established in the oncological therapeutic standards (surgery, chemotherapy and radiation therapy). A racotumomab-alum solution is administered by intradermal injection every 14 days for the first 2 months (5 doses), followed by monthly booster doses.

== Pharmacology ==
=== Mechanism of action ===
Gangliosides are concentrated on the surface of mammalian cells and play an important role in cell growth and differentiation. NGc gangliosides, however, are practically undetectable in healthy human tissues and fluids due to a genetic deletion in the human gene that encodes the enzyme responsible for the synthesis of NGc, the CMP-N-acetyl hydroxylase. Nonetheless, the NGcGM3 ganglioside is highly expressed in several human cancers, including lung, breast, melanocytes, colon and neuroectodermal pediatric tumors, making this neoantigen an attractive target for cancer therapy.

Racotumomab is an anti-idiotypic mouse monoclonal antibody that mimics NGc gangliosides, thus triggering an immune response against the tumor antigen NGcGM3. Therefore, rather than being a passive antibody therapy, Racotumomab acts as a therapeutic vaccine. In melanoma, breast, and lung cancer patients, Racotumomab was able to elicit a specific immune response that recognized and directly killed tumor cells expressing the neoantigen by a mechanism of oncotic necrosis. The specific expression of NGcGM3 in malignant cells reduces the potential risk of an immune cross-reactivity that could cause serious adverse effects.

== Adverse effects ==
Racotumomab is well tolerated by patients. The overall toxicity of the vaccine has been classified as grade 1 and 2, according to the NCI Common Toxicity Criteria (version 3.0). Treatment is mostly associated with mild to moderate injection site reactions (local erythema, induration and pain), which disappear within 24–48 hours. Systemic reactions, such as flu-like symptoms and chills are less frequent, reversible, and self-limited.

== History ==
=== Clinical trials ===
A randomized, multicenter, phase III study of active specific immunotherapy with Racotumomab plus best support treatment, versus best support treatment in patients with advanced NSCLC who have achieved an objective response (partial or complete) or stable disease with standard first-line treatment is underway in Argentina, Brazil, Cuba, Indonesia, Philippines, Singapore, Thailand and Uruguay. 1,082 patients with NSCLC in stages IIIA (non-resectable), IIIB or IV will be evaluated in the study. The study is sponsored by Recombio in collaboration with Elea Laboratories (Argentina), CIM (Cuba), Europharma Laboratories (Brazil), Innogene Kalbiotech (Singapore) and several public research institutions.
