= Geoffrey W. Hoffmann =

Australian-Canadian scientist (born 1944)

- Born: October 20, 1944 (age 81); Australia
- Known for: Immune network theory
- Scientific career
- Fields: Immune network theory

Geoffrey William Hoffmann (born October 20, 1944) is an Australian-Canadian theoretical biologist. Hoffmann was a faculty member in the Department of Physics at the University of British Columbia and the founder of Network Immunology Inc. in Vancouver, Canada. He is best known for symmetric immune network theory.

== Education and early research ==
Hoffmann studied physics at the University of Melbourne then obtained a PhD at the Technische Universität Braunschweig as a student of Manfred Eigen for research done at the Max Planck Institute for Biophysical Chemistry in Göttingen.

His initial work in theoretical biology addressed Leslie Orgel's paradox in origin of life theories. Hoffmann showed that an early sloppy translation machinery can be stable against the error catastrophe envisaged by Orgel and provided analyses of the expected occurrence of required catalytic activities and exclusion of disruptive catalytic activities. These calculations support the view that the origin of replication and metabolism together is plausible.

== Immune network theory ==
Hoffmann subsequently joined the Basel Institute for Immunology, where Niels Jerne had proposed that the immune system is a network, consisting of antibodies and lymphocytes that recognize not only things that are foreign to the body, but also each other. Immune network theory became, and remains, Hoffmann's primary research focus. He developed the symmetrical immune network theory based on Jerne's hypothesis. This theory involves symmetrical stimulatory, inhibitory and killing interactions, and is a framework for understanding, using a small number of postulates, a number of immunological phenomena that are not readily explained otherwise.

=== Application to HIV pathogenesis ===
Because symmetrical immune network theory offers a novel model of HIV pathogenesis, Hoffmann and his lab at the University of British Columbia contributed basic research relevant to the search for an HIV vaccine. Achievements included the co-discovery of "second symmetry", a co-study on antibodies made in a normal immune response that bind both to foreign invaders and to antibodies with the same specificity, and the discovery, with others, that mice immunized with foreign lymphocytes make anti HIV antibodies.

== Neural networks ==
Hoffmann noted many similarities between the immune system and the brain, including that:

- both systems have memory and are able to respond appropriately to a wide range of stimuli
- both networks consist of comparable numbers of cells, and
- both systems have a profound sense of self.

The analogy resulted in the discovery of a neural network in which neurons exhibit hysteresis and thus can learn without synaptic modification. He also discovered, with Davenport, a way to add hidden neurons to Hopfield neural networks and thus extend their associative memory capacity.

== Network theory of war ==
Hoffmann proposed that wars are enabled by selective processes that influence how individuals advance within societies. He argues that such processes occur in all societies, democratic or not, and can be counteracted by increased contact between individual citizens across national or cultural divides.
