= Hook effect =

Immunologic phenomenon occurring in high antigen or antibody levels

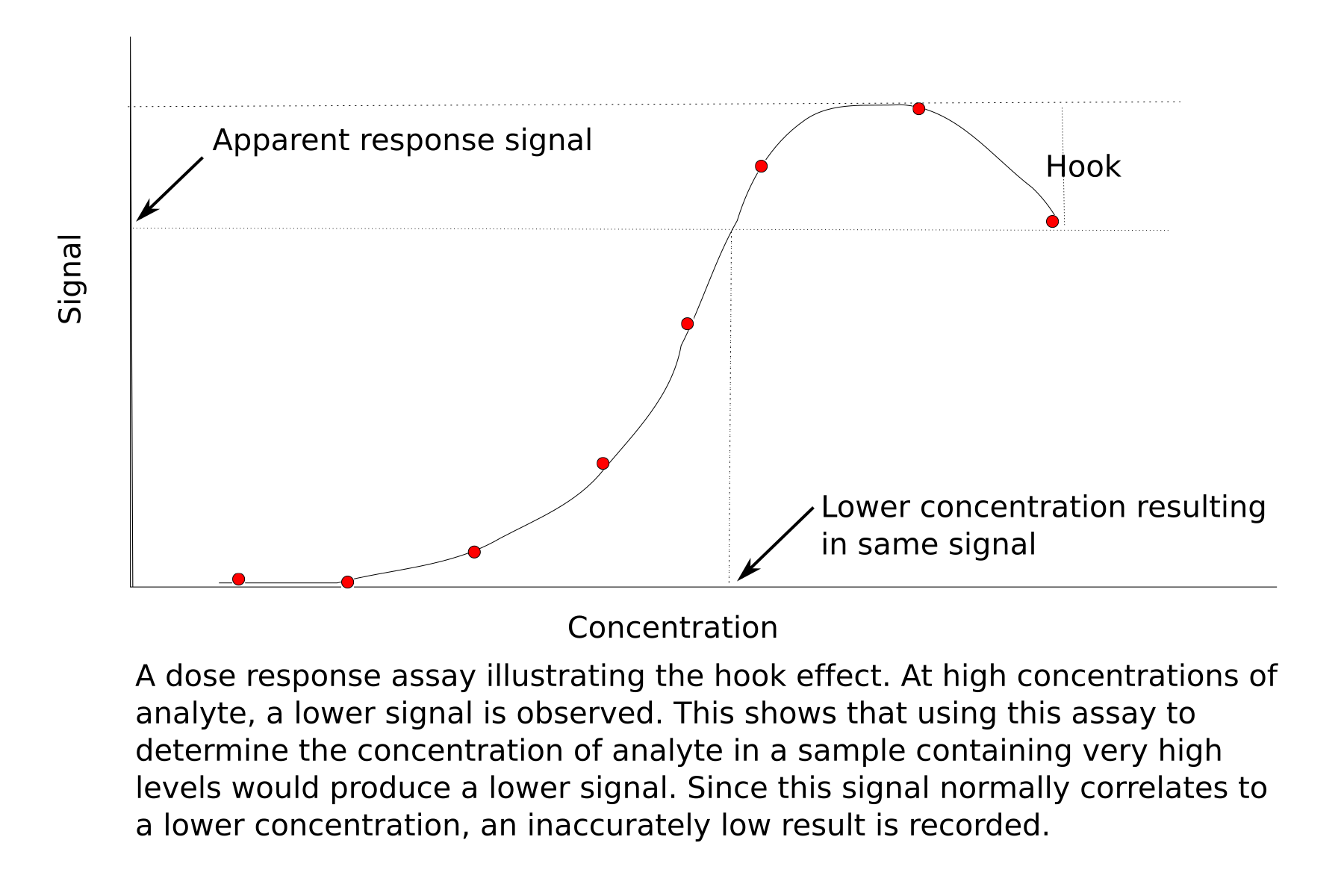
Illustration of hook effect adapted from Schiettecatte et al.

The hook effect refers to the prozone phenomenon, also known as antibody excess, or the postzone phenomenon, also known as antigen excess. It is an immunologic phenomenon whereby the effectiveness of antibodies to form immune complexes can be impaired when concentrations of an antibody or an antigen are very high. The formation of immune complexes stops increasing with greater concentrations and then decreases at extremely high concentrations, producing a hook shape on a graph of measurements. An important practical relevance of the phenomenon is as a type of interference that plagues certain immunoassays and nephelometric assays, resulting in false negatives or inaccurately low results. Other common forms of interference include antibody interference, cross-reactivity and signal interference. The phenomenon is caused by very high concentrations of a particular analyte or antibody and is most prevalent in one-step (sandwich) immunoassays

Also, soluble antibodies that aggregate soluble antigens are referred to as precipitin, while soluble antigens that induces the formation of lattices, cross links, when antigens and antibodies exist in optimal concentrations.

== Mechanism and in vitro importance ==
=== Prozone – excess antibodies ===
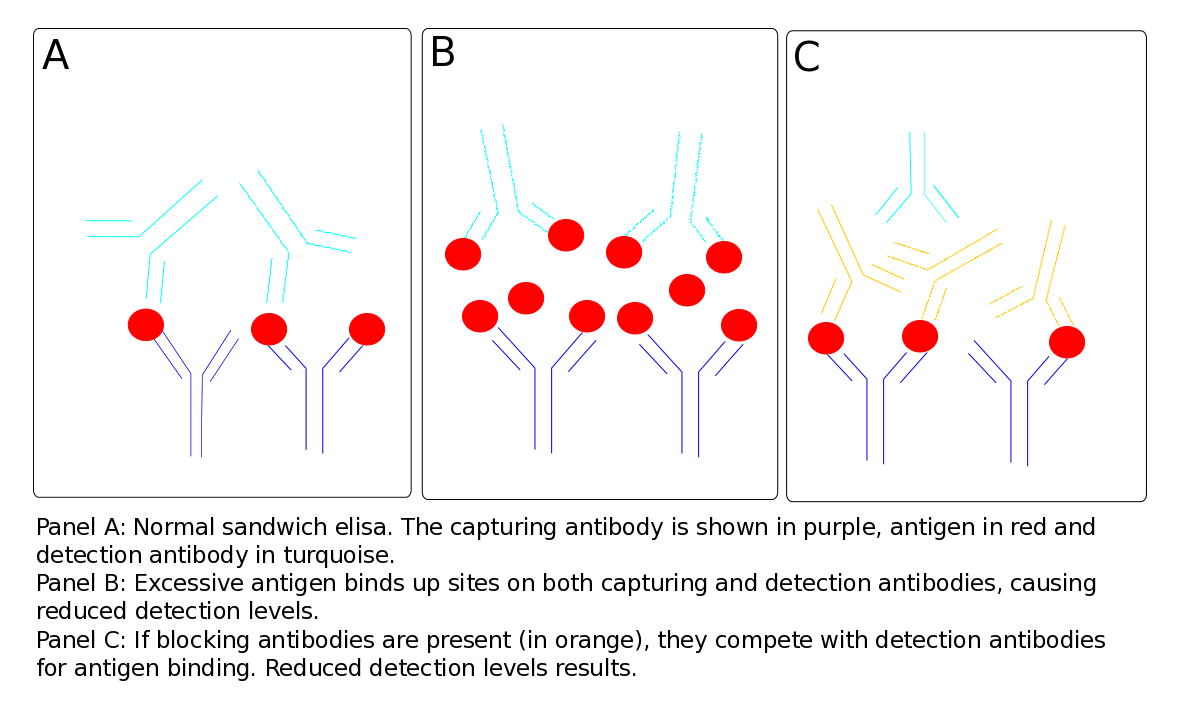
Illustration of the effects of excess antigen and blocking antibodies on immunoassays.

In an agglutination test, a person's serum (which contains antibodies) is added to a test tube, which contains a particular antigen. If the antibodies interact with the antigen to form immune complexes, called agglutination, then the test is interpreted as positive. However, if too many antibodies that can bind to the antigen are present, then the antigenic sites are coated by antibodies, and few or no antibodies directed toward the pathogen are able to bind more than one antigenic particle. Since the antibodies do not bridge between antigens, no agglutination occurs. Because no agglutination occurs, the test is interpreted as negative. In this case, the result is a false negative. The range of relatively high antibody concentrations within which no reaction occurs is called the prozone.

=== Postzone – excess antigens ===
The effect can also occur because of antigen excess, when both the capture and detection antibodies become saturated by the high analyte concentration. In this case, no sandwich can be formed by the capturing antibody, the antigen and the detection antibody. In this case, free antigen is in competition with captured antigen for detection antibody binding. Sequential addition of antigen and antibody, paired with stringent washing, can prevent the effect, as can increasing the relative concentration of antibody to antigen, thereby mediating the effect.

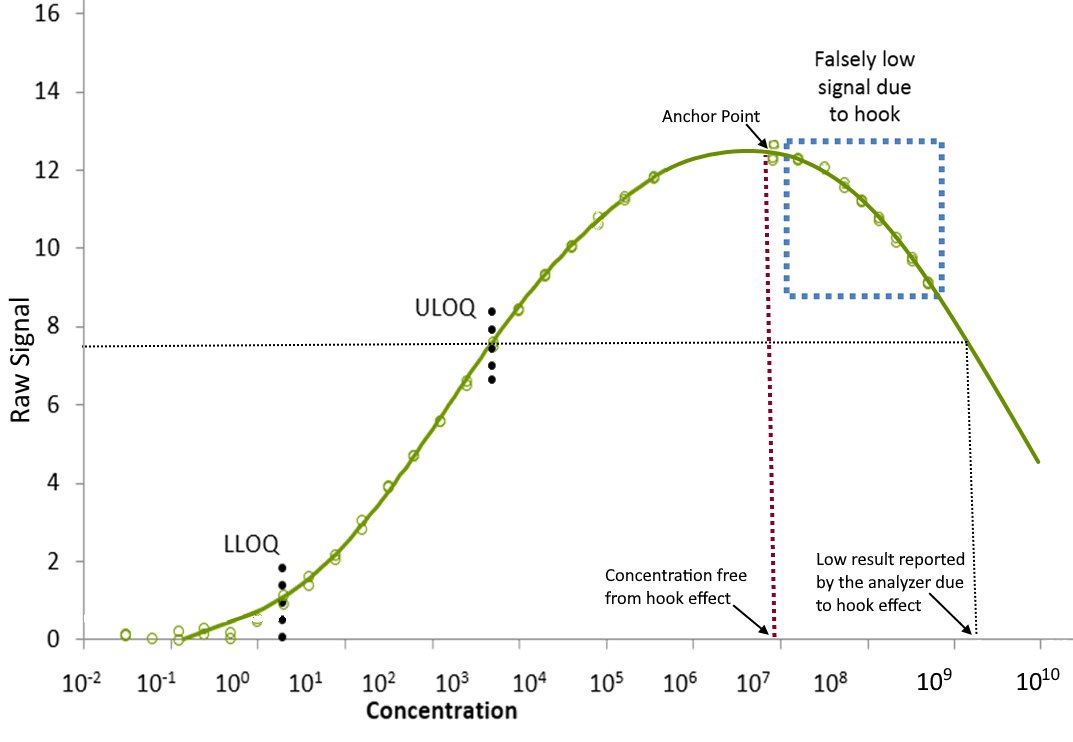
Simple illustration of the effects of excess antigen and dosage response curve.

Examples include high levels of syphilis antibodies in HIV patients or high levels of cryptococcal antigen leading to false negative tests in undiluted samples. This phenomenon is also seen in serological tests for Brucellosis. It may be seen in precipitation reactions. The antibody that fails to react is known as the blocking antibody and prevents the precipitating antibody from binding to the antigens. Thus the proper precipitation reaction does not take place. However, when the serum is diluted, the blocking antibody is as well and its concentration decreases enough for the proper precipitation reaction to occur.

== In vivo observations ==
Lewis Thomas described in his memoir a physiologic experiment of 1941 in which he observed the prozone effect in vivo: immunity in rabbits to meningococcus, which was robust, unexpectedly decreased when immunization was used to induce a heightened antibody response. In other words, getting the rabbits' bodies to produce more antibodies against this bacterium had the counterproductive effect of decreasing their immunity to it. From the viewpoint of an overly simplistic notion of the antibody/antigen relationship, this seems paradoxical, although it is clearly logical from a viewpoint duly informed by present-day molecular biology. Thomas was interested in pursuing this physiologic research further, and remained so for decades afterward, but his career took him in other directions and he was not aware of anyone having pursued it by the time of his memoir. One kind of relevance that he hypothesized for this in vivo blocking antibody concept was as a driver of human susceptibility to certain infectious diseases. In the decades since, the concept has also been found to have clinical relevance in allergen immunotherapy, where blocking antibodies can interfere with other antibodies involved in hypersensitivity and thus improve allergy treatment.

== See also ==
- Blocking antibody
