= Allotype (immunology) =

The allotype affects the constant region (labeled CL and CH1-3 in the diagram.)

The word allotype comes from two Greek roots, allo meaning 'other or differing from the norm' and typos meaning 'mark'. In immunology, allotype is an immunoglobulin variation (in addition to isotypic variation) that can be found among antibody classes and is manifested by heterogeneity of immunoglobulins present in a single vertebrate species. The structure of immunoglobulin polypeptide chain is dictated and controlled by number of genes encoded in the germ line. However, these genes, as it was discovered by serologic and chemical methods, could be highly polymorphic. This polymorphism is subsequently projected to the overall amino acid structure of antibody chains. Polymorphic epitopes can be present on immunoglobulin constant regions on both heavy and light chains, differing between individuals or ethnic groups and in some cases may pose as immunogenic determinants. Exposure of individuals to a non-self allotype might elicit an anti- allotype response and became cause of problems for example in a patient after transfusion of blood or in a pregnant woman. However, it is important to mention that not all variations in immunoglobulin amino acid sequence pose as a determinant responsible for immune response. Some of these allotypic determinants may be present at places that are not well exposed and therefore can be hardly serologically discriminated. In other cases, variation in one isotype can be compensated by the presence of this determinant on another antibody isotype in one individual. This means that divergent allotype of heavy chain of IgG antibody may be balanced by presence of this allotype on heavy chain of for example IgA antibody and therefore is called isoallotypic variant. Especially large number of polymorphisms were discovered in IgG antibody subclasses. Which were practically used in forensic medicine and in paternity testing, before replaced by modern day DNA fingerprinting.

== Definition and organisation of allotypes in humans ==
Human allotypes nomenclature was first described in alphabetical system and further systematized in numerical system, but both could be found in the literature. For example, allotype expressed on constant region of heavy chain on IgG are designated by Gm which stands for ‘genetic marker ‘ together with IgG subclass (IgG1 àG1m, IgG2 àG2m) and the allotype number or letter [ G1m1/ G1m (a) ]. Polymorphisms within IgA are denoted in the same way as A2m (eg. A2m1/2) and kappa light chains constant region polymorphisms as Km (eg. Km1). Despite the fact, that there are multiple known lambda chain isotypes, there have not been reported any lambda chain serological polymorphisms.

All these before mentioned allotypes are expressed on constant regions of the immunoglobulin. Genes responsible for encoding structure of constant regions of heavy chains are closely linked and therefore inherited together as one haplotype with low number of crossovers. Although some crossovers did occur during human evolution resulting in the creation of current populations characteristic haplotypes and importance of allotype system in population studies.

== Implications for monoclonal antibody therapy ==
Antibody allotypes came back to spotlight due to development and use of therapies based on monoclonal antibodies. These recombinant human glycoproteins and proteins are now well established in clinical practise, but sometimes leads to adverse effects such as generation of antitherapeutic antibodies that negates therapy or even cause severe reactions to the therapy. This reaction may be attributed to differences between therapeutics itself or may arise between same therapeutics produced by different companies or even between different lots produced by the same company. To prevent production of such antitherapeutic antibodies, ideally, all clinical used proteins and glycoproteins should poses same allotype as natural patient’s product, this way the presence of ‘altered self‘ which poses a potential target for immune system, is limited. Whilst many parameters connected to developing and manufacturing process that might predispose monoclonal antibodies to cause immune response are well known and appropriate steps are taken to monitor and control these unwanted effects, complications linked with administration of monoclonal antibodies to genetically diverse human population are less well described. Humans exhibit abundance of genotypes and phenotypes, however all currently licensed IgG therapeutic immunoglobulins are developed as single allotypic/ polymorphic form. Patients that are homozygous for alternative phenotype are therefore at higher risk of developing potential immune response to the therapy.

== See also ==
- Allotype (disambiguation)
- Idiotype
- Isotype
