= CD4 immunoadhesin =

CD4 immunoadhesin is a recombinant fusion protein consisting of a combination of CD4 and the fragment crystallizable region, similarly known as immunoglobulin. It belongs to the antibody (Ig) gene family. CD4 is a surface receptor for human immunodeficiency virus (HIV). The CD4 immunoadhesin molecular fusion allow the protein to possess key functions from each independent subunit. The CD4 specific properties include the gp120-binding and HIV-blocking capabilities. Properties specific to immunoglobulin are the long plasma half-life and Fc receptor binding. The properties of the protein means that it has potential to be used in AIDS therapy as of 2017. Specifically, CD4 immunoadhesin plays a role in antibody-dependent cell-mediated cytotoxicity (ADCC) towards HIV-infected cells. While natural anti-gp120 antibodies exhibit a response towards uninfected CD4-expressing cells that have a soluble gp120 bound to the CD4 on the cell surface, CD4 immunoadhesin, however, will not exhibit a response. One of the most relevant of these possibilities is its ability to cross the placenta.

== History and significance ==
CD4 immunoadhesin was first developed in the mid-1990s as a potential therapeutic agent and treatment for HIV/AIDS. The protein is a fusion of the extracellular domain of the CD4 receptor and the Fc domain of human immunoglobulin G (IgG), the most abundant antibody isotype in the human body. The Fc domain of IgG contributes several important properties to the fusion protein, including increased half-life in the bloodstream, enhanced binding to Fc receptors on immune cells, and the ability to activate complement.

The development of CD4 immunoadhesin stems from the observation that the CD4 receptor plays a critical role in the entry of HIV into human cells. The CD4 receptor is used as a primary receptor by HIV to attach to the surface of target cells. HIV then uses a co-receptor, either CCR5 or CXCR4, to facilitate entry into the cell. The ability of CD4 immunoadhesin to block the interaction between the CD4 receptor and HIV was intended to prevent HIV from entering and infecting human cells.

CD4 immunoadhesin has been extensively studied in preclinical and clinical trials as a potential treatment for HIV/AIDS. In addition to its antiviral activity, CD4 immunoadhesin has also been investigated for its potential immunomodulatory effects. For example, the fusion protein has been shown to induce the production of cytokines, such as interleukin-2 (IL-2) and interferon-gamma (IFN-γ), which are important for the activation and proliferation of immune cells.

Despite its potential as a therapeutic agent, the development of CD4 immunoadhesin has faced several challenges. One major obstacle is the emergence of drug-resistant strains of HIV, which can limit the effectiveness of CD4 immunoadhesin in certain patients. Additionally, the need for frequent dosing and the potential for immune responses against the fusion protein have also limited the clinical application of CD4 immunoadhesin.

Nevertheless, knowledge on the function of CD4 immunoadhesin has contributed to increased understanding of the biology of HIV and the mechanisms of viral entry. The protein has also inspired the development of other immunoadhesin molecules, such as CD4-IgG2 and CD4-mimetic compounds, which are being investigated as potential therapies for HIV/AIDS.

== Structure and function ==
CD4 immunoadhesin is a bifunctional protein that has the ability to block HIV infection, inhibit autoreactive T-cell activation, and potentially modulate immune responses. Its structure, which consists of the extracellular domain of CD4 and the Fc region of IgG1, allows for soluble circulation throughout the body.

The structure of eCD4-Ig and subunits that bind to HIV-1 gp120.

The extracellular domain of CD4 contains four immunoglobulin-like domains (D1-D4), which are responsible for binding to the major histocompatibility complex (MHC) class II molecules on antigen-presenting cells. The Fc region of IgG1 is responsible for mediating effector functions such as antibody-dependent cell-mediated cytotoxicity (ADCC) and complement activation.

CD4-Ig works by mimicking the binding of CD4 to HIV, thereby preventing the virus from infecting T-helper cells. HIV infects T-helper cells by binding to the CD4 receptor and the co-receptor CCR5 or CXCR4. CD4-Ig binds to the viral envelope glycoprotein gp120, which is responsible for HIV binding to CD4. By binding to gp120, CD4-Ig prevents the virus from binding to the CD4 receptor on T-helper cells, thus preventing infection.

CD4-Ig has also been investigated as a potential treatment for other diseases that involve immune dysregulation, such as multiple sclerosis and rheumatoid arthritis. In these diseases, CD4-Ig may work by inhibiting the activation of autoreactive T-cells. CD4-Ig binds to MHC class II molecules on antigen-presenting cells, thereby preventing the activation of T-helper cells that are specific for self-antigens.

In addition to its role in blocking HIV infection and inhibiting autoreactive T-cell activation, CD4-Ig may also have immunomodulatory effects. CD4 is known to be involved in the regulation of immune responses, and CD4-Ig may therefore have the ability to modulate immune responses in a way that is beneficial for the treatment of various diseases.

CD4 immunoadhesin functions by blocking the interaction between the HIV envelope glycoprotein (gp120) and the CD4 receptor on the surface of CD4-positive cells. By binding to gp120, CD4 immunoadhesin prevents the virus from attaching to and entering host cells, thus inhibiting the spread of HIV infection. CD4 immunoadhesin has been shown to be effective in vitro and in animal models of HIV infection, and has been used in clinical trials as a potential treatment for HIV/AIDS.

== Clinical applications ==
CD4 immunoadhesin has been studied extensively in preclinical and clinical trials as a potential treatment for HIV/AIDS. In a phase I/II clinical trial, CD4 immunoadhesin was found to be safe and well-tolerated in HIV-positive patients, and was able to reduce viral load in some patients. However, the development of CD4 immunoadhesin as a therapeutic agent for HIV/AIDS has limitations, including the emergence of drug-resistant strains of HIV, the need for frequent dosing, and the potential for immune responses against the fusion protein.

In a phase I/II clinical trial conducted by the National Institute of Allergy and Infectious Diseases (NIAID), 25 HIV-positive patients received intravenous infusions of CD4 immunoadhesin over a period of 12 weeks. The trial found that CD4 immunoadhesin was safe and well-tolerated in all patients, with no serious adverse events reported. Additionally, some patients showed a reduction in viral load, although the effect was not sustained after the end of the treatment period.

Despite these results, the development of CD4 immunoadhesin as a therapeutic agent for HIV/AIDS has faced several difficulties. One major obstacle is the emergence of drug-resistant strains of HIV, which can limit the effectiveness of CD4 immunoadhesin in certain patients. Additionally, the need for frequent dosing and the potential for immune responses against the fusion protein have also limited the clinical application of CD4 immunoadhesin.

To address these challenges, researchers have explored various strategies to improve the efficacy and safety of CD4 immunoadhesin. For example, some studies have investigated the use of CD4 immunoadhesin in combination with other antiretroviral therapies to enhance the antiviral effect and reduce the risk of drug resistance. Other studies have focused on engineering CD4 immunoadhesin variants with improved pharmacokinetic properties and reduced immunogenicity.

== Future uses ==
CD4 immunoadhesin has been used in the treatment of various diseases; many of which are still being studied and developed. Here are some future uses of CD4 immunoadhesin:

1. HIV/AIDS: CD4 immunoadhesin has been studied extensively for its potential use in the treatment of HIV/AIDS. It works by binding to the viral envelope protein and blocking the entry of the virus into CD4+ T cells, thereby inhibiting viral replication. A phase I/II clinical trial involving CD4 immunoadhesin showed promising results in reducing the viral load in HIV-infected patients . Further studies are underway to explore the efficacy of CD4 immunoadhesin as a therapeutic agent for HIV/AIDS.
2. Autoimmune diseases: CD4 immunoadhesin has been investigated for its potential use in the treatment of autoimmune diseases such as rheumatoid arthritis, multiple sclerosis, and psoriasis. It acts by binding to the CD4 receptor on T cells and inhibiting the activation and proliferation of autoreactive T cells. Preclinical studies have shown that CD4 immunoadhesin can reduce disease severity and improve clinical outcomes in animal models of autoimmune diseases.
3. Cancer: CD4 immunoadhesin has shown potential in the treatment of cancer, particularly in enhancing the immune response against cancer cells. It works by targeting the CD4 receptor on T cells and stimulating the production of cytokines and chemokines that can promote tumor cell death. CD4 immunoadhesin has been shown to be effective in preclinical studies of various types of cancer, including melanoma, breast cancer, and leukemia.
4. Inflammatory diseases: CD4 immunoadhesin has been investigated for its potential use in the treatment of inflammatory diseases such as asthma and chronic obstructive pulmonary disease (COPD). It acts by binding to the CD4 receptor on T cells and reducing the release of pro-inflammatory cytokines and chemokines that cause inflammation in the lungs. Preclinical studies have shown that CD4 immunoadhesin can reduce inflammation and improve lung function in animal models of asthma and COPD.
