= Cytosine deaminase =

Class of enzymes

Identifiers
- EC no.: 3.5.4.1
- CAS no.: 9025-05-2

Databases
- BRENDA: enzyme data
- ExPASy: NiceZyme view
- KEGG: enzyme entry
- MetaCyc: metabolic pathway
- Rhea: reactions
- PDB structures: RCSB PDB PDBe PDBsum
- Gene Ontology: AmiGO / QuickGO
Search
- PMC: articles
- PubMed: articles
- NCBI: proteins

Cytosine deaminase (EC 3.5.4.1) is an enzyme characterised from yeast that catalyzes the hydrolysis of the nucleotide base, cytosine, to uracil and ammonia:

cytosine
H_{2}O
NH_{3}
uracil

The reaction is part of the pyrimidine salvage pathway.

In fungi, the enzyme is known to convert 5-fluorcytosine, an antifungal medication prodrug, into 5-fluorouracil, a cytotoxic chemotherapy drug.

This enzyme is a hydrolase, one acting on carbon-nitrogen bonds other than peptide bonds, specifically in cyclic amidines. The systematic name of this enzyme class is cytosine aminohydrolase. This enzyme is also called isocytosine deaminase.

== Structural studies ==
As of late 2007, 13 structures have been solved for this class of enzymes, with PDB accession codes PDB: 1K6W, PDB: 1K70, PDB: 1OX7, PDB: 1P6O, PDB: 1R9X, PDB: 1R9Y, PDB: 1RA0, PDB: 1RA5, PDB: 1RAK, PDB: 1RB7, PDB: 1UAQ, PDB: 1YSB, and PDB: 1YSD.
