= Idiotype =

Variable region of an antibody or a T-cell receptor

The idiotype is based upon the variable region (labeled VL and VH in the diagram.)

In immunology, an idiotype is a shared characteristic between a group of immunoglobulin or T-cell receptor (TCR) molecules based upon the antigen binding specificity and therefore structure of their variable region. The variable region of antigen receptors of T cells (TCRs) and B cells (immunoglobulins) contain complementarity-determining regions (CDRs) with unique amino acid sequences. They define the surface and properties of the variable region, determining the antigen specificity and therefore the idiotope of the molecule. Immunoglobulins or TCRs with a shared idiotope are the same idiotype. Antibody idiotype is determined by:

- Gene rearrangement
- Junctional diversity
- P-nucleotides (palindromic nucleotides at sites of single-strand breaks)
- N-nucleotides
- Somatic hypermutations

== Etymology and usage ==
The word idiotype comes from two Greek roots, idio meaning 'private, distinctive, peculiar' and typos meaning 'mark.' Thus, idiotype describes the distinctive sequence and region that makes any immunoglobulin/TCR unique from others of the same type which is its variable region.

The term "idiotype" is sometimes used to describe the collection of multiple idiotopes, and therefore overall antigen binding capacity, possessed by an antibody.

The word "idiotype" became influential in immunology when Niels Jerne formulated his immune network theory. Jerne was awarded the Nobel Prize in Physiology or Medicine in 1984 largely for being the father of immune network theory. He defined idiotype as the set of epitopes on the V region of an antibody molecule, where epitope means an antigenic determinant. He also defined the "paratope" to be that part of an antibody variable region that binds to an antigen. The best developed version of immune network theory is called the symmetrical network theory, in which the distinction between idiotype and paratope plays no role.

== See also ==
- Allotype (immunology)
- Isotype (immunology)
- Immune network theory
