= Anti-idiotypic vaccine =

Vaccine

Anti-idiotypic vaccines consist of antibodies that have three-dimensional immunogenic regions, termed idiotopes, that consist of protein sequences that bind to cell receptors. Idiotopes are aggregated into idiotypes specific to their target antigen. An example of an anti-idiotype antibody is Racotumomab.

== Production and use ==
To produce an anti-idiotypic vaccine, antibodies that bind tumor-associated antigens (TAA) are isolated and injected into mice. To the murine immune system, the TAA antibodies are antigens and cause an immunogenic reaction producing murine antibodies that can bind to the "TAA idiotype" and is said to be "anti-idiotypic". The resulting murine antibodies are harvested and used to vaccinate other mice. The resulting antibodies in the second set of mice have a three-dimensional binding site that mimics the original antibodies that bind tumor-associated antigens. These antibodies are combined with an adjuvant and given as a vaccine. The murine immune system essentially "amplifies" a small mass of TAA antibodies into a much larger mass used to vaccinate humans. Because the antibody produced using the "anti-idiotypic" process closely resembles the original epitope of the antigen, these antibodies can be used to induce immune responses from cellular to antibody-antigen for a given antigen, e. g., TAA, when administered as a vaccine to a human. They are mainly used for high risk cancer patients.
