= Immunoconjugate =

Antibodies joined to a second molecule

Immunoconjugates are antibodies conjugated (joined) to a second molecule, usually a toxin, radioisotope or label.

These conjugates are used in immunotherapy and to develop monoclonal antibody therapy as a targeted form of chemotherapy when they are often known as antibody-drug conjugates.

Immunoconjugates that include a radioisotope are used in radioimmunotherapy. When immunoconjugates include a toxin, they are known as immunotoxins.
