= Blocking antibody =

A blocking antibody is an antibody that does not have a reaction when combined with an antigen, but prevents other antibodies from combining with that antigen. This function of blocking antibodies has had a variety of clinical and experimental uses.

The term can also be used for inhibiting antibodies, prozone phenomenon, and agglutination reaction.

Blocking antibodies have been described as a mechanism for HSV-1 to evade the immune system.

== Uses ==
Blocking antibodies can be used in a variety of medical and scientific manners, thus far been to treat cancer, Graves' disease, and prevent the growth of malaria in mosquitoes.

=== Cancer treatment ===
Blocking antibodies have been used in clinical trials of cancer treatments. The blocking antibody ipilimumab has been effectively used in the clinical treatment of melanoma, renal cell carcinoma (RCC), and non-small-cell lung cancer (NSCLC) with some degree of success. This is accomplished through the blocking of the coinhibitory molecule CTLA-4. The blocking antibody does not directly target tumor cells, but rather blocks the regulatory functions of CTLA-4, resulting in enhanced T-cell function.

Some new treatments hypothesize the blocking of PD-1, a programmed cell-death protein, which will result in longer-lived T-cells. The blocking antibody BMS-936559 has been shown to bind to PD-L1 and prevent its binding to PD-1.

These new treatments are not without side-effects and immune-related adverse events have been observed in a variety of patients. The tolerance that immune cells normally have to host tissues can be lost, resulting in permanent damage to host cells.

=== Graves' disease ===
Studies have shown that blocking antibodies can bind to and prevent thyrotropin binding, resulting in reduced cAMP levels in human thyroid cells. This interaction has been used primarily as a method of indicating that Graves' disease immunoglobulins are pluritopic, meaning that they have multiple effects, rather than indicating a possible treatment for this disease.

=== Malaria ===
Blocking antibodies have a variety of functions on the merozoite form of parasitic malaria. While in the merozoite form, malaria parasites invade erythrocytes and reproduce in them. Some blocking antibodies may inhibit the invasion of erythrocytes, while other blocking antibodies prevent the binding of inhibitory antibodies, allowing merozoite invasion of erythrocytes despite the presence of inhibitory antibodies. The monoclonal antibodies that prevent the invasion of merozoites bind to the parasitic antigen MSP-1 (merozoite surface protein 1). The binding of blocking antibodies to MSP-1 is shown to result in the inhibition of secondary processing, resulting in the inability for merozoites to invade host erythrocytes. Secondary processing involves a single proteolytic cleavage on the merozoite surface of the carboxy-terminal component of MSP-1. The blocking of MSP-1 has been proposed to be a method of creating a vaccine against malaria by preventing its invasion and multiplication.

== See also ==
- Neutralizing antibody
