= Idiotopes =

Unique set of epitopes of the variable portion of an antibody

In immunology, an idiotope is the unique set of antigenic determinants (epitopes) of the variable portion of an antibody. In some cases it can be the actual antigen-binding site, and in some cases it may comprise variable region sequences outside of the antigen-binding site on the antibody itself. Thus each antibody would have multiple idiotopes and the set of these individual idiotopes is termed the idiotype of the antibody.

Idiotopes contrast with allotopes, which are non-varying structures on the Fc receptor.

If a separate antibody is produced that has specific binding capabilities to an idiotope of the previously described antibody, it is said to be an "anti-idiotypic antibody". If such is the case, the anti-idiotypic antibodies will be able to bind to the B lymphocyte receptor for the original antigen and inhibit the immune response to that antigen.

This type of regulation was proposed by Danish immunologist Niels Jerne in 1974. He termed it the "Network Hypothesis". This type of B lymphocyte regulation may be partially responsible for preventing an immune response from getting out of control, which would elicit damage to host tissue or even cause an autoimmune diseased state.

Because of the resemblance of anti-idiotypic antibodies to the original antigen, vaccine studies have been performed. These types of vaccines are called "anti-idiotypic vaccines". An anti-idiotypic monoclonal antibody was generated to possess an "internal image of cocaine". The anti-idiotypic antibody bound to the human dopamine transporter with mimicry of the cocaine molecule and completely inhibited cocaine binding. None are produced commercially to date.
