= Isotype (immunology) =

Classifications of antibodies

Some antibodies form complexes that bind to multiple antigen molecules.

1. Fab region; 2. Fc region; 3. Heavy chain (blue) with one variable (V_{H}) domain followed by a constant domain (C_{H}1), a hinge region, and two more constant (C_{H}2 and C_{H}3) domains; 4. Light chain (green) with one variable (V_{L}) and one constant (C_{L}) domain; 5. Antigen binding site (paratope); 6. Hinge regions

In immunology, antibodies (immunoglobulins (Ig)) are classified into several types called isotypes or classes. The variable (V) regions near the tip of the antibody can differ from molecule to molecule in countless ways, allowing it to specifically target an antigen (or more exactly, an epitope). In contrast, the constant (C) regions only occur in a few variants, which define the antibody's class. Antibodies of different classes activate distinct effector mechanisms in response to an antigen (triggering different elements of the innate immune system). They appear at different stages of an immune response, differ in structural features, and in their location around the body.

Isotype expression reflects the maturation stage of a B cell. Naive B cells express IgM and IgD isotypes with unmutated variable genes, which are produced from the same initial transcript following alternative splicing. Expression of other antibody isotypes (in humans: IgG, IgA, and IgE) occurs via a process of class switching after antigen exposure. Class switching is mediated by the enzyme AID (activation-induced cytidine deaminase) and occurs after the B cell binds an antigen through its B cell receptor. Class-switching usually requires interaction with a T helper cell.

In humans, there are five heavy chain isotypes α,δ,γ,ε,μ, corresponding to five antibody isotypes:

- α – IgA, further divided into subclasses IgA1 and IgA2
- δ – IgD
- γ – IgG, further divided into subclasses IgG1 to IgG4
- ε – IgE
- μ – IgM

There are also two light chain isotypes κ and λ; however, there is no significant difference in function between the two. Thus an antibody isotype is determined by the constant regions of the heavy chains only.

IgM is first expressed as a monomer on the surface of immature B cells. Upon antigenic stimulation, IgM+ B cells secrete pentameric IgM antibody formed by five Ig monomers which are linked via disulfide bonds. The pentamer also contains a polypeptide J-chain, which links two of the monomers and facilitates secretion at mucosal surfaces. The pentameric structure of IgM antibodies makes them efficient at binding antigens with repetitive epitopes (e.g. bacterial capsule, viral capsid) and activation of complement cascade. As IgM antibodies are expressed early in a B cell response, they are rarely highly mutated and have broad antigen reactivity thus providing an early response to a wide range of antigens without the need for T cell help.

IgD isotypes are expressed on naive B cells as they leave bone marrow and populate secondary lymphoid organs. The levels of surface expression of IgD isotype has been associated with differences in B cell activation status but their role in serum is poorly understood.

The IgG, IgE and IgA antibody isotypes are generated following class-switching during germinal centre reaction and provide different effector functions in response to specific antigens. IgG is the most abundant antibody class in the serum and it is divided into 4 subclasses based on differences in the structure of the constant region genes and the ability to trigger different effector functions. Despite the high sequence similarity (90% identical on the amino acid level), each subclass has a different half-life, a unique profile of antigen binding and distinct capacity for complement activation. IgG1 antibodies are the most abundant IgG class and dominate the responses to protein antigens. Impaired production of IgG1 is observed in some cases of immunodeficiency and is associated with recurrent infections. The IgG responses to bacterial capsular polysaccharide antigens are mediated primarily via IgG2 subclass, and deficiencies in this subclass result in susceptibility to certain bacterial species. IgG2 represents the major antibody subclass reacting to glycan antigens but IgG1 and IgG3 subclasses have also been observed in such responses, particularly in the case of protein-glycan conjugates.

IgG3 is an efficient activator of pro-inflammatory responses by triggering the classical complement pathway. It has the shortest half-life compared to the other IgG subclasses and is frequently present together with IgG1 in response to protein antigens after viral infections. IgG4 is the least abundant IgG subclass in the serum and is often generated following repeated exposure to the same antigen or during persistent infections.

IgA antibodies are secreted in the respiratory or the intestinal tract and act as the main mediators of mucosal immunity. They are monomeric in the serum, but appear as a dimer termed secretory IgA (sIgA) at mucosal surfaces. The secretory IgA is associated with a J-chain and another polypeptide chain called the secretory component. IgA antibodies are divided into two subclasses that differ in the size of their hinge region. IgA1 has a longer hinge region which increases its sensitivity to bacterial proteases. Therefore, this subclass dominates the serum IgA, while IgA2 is predominantly found in mucosal secretions. Complement fixation by IgA is not a major effector mechanism at the mucosal surface but IgA receptor is expressed on neutrophils which may be activated to mediate antibody-dependent cellular cytotoxicity. sIgA has also been shown to potentiate the immune response in intestinal tissue by uptake of antigen together with the bound antibody by dendritic cells.

IgE antibodies are present at lowest concentrations in peripheral blood but constitute the main antibody class in allergic responses through the engagement of mast cells, eosinophils and Langerhans cells. Responses to specific helminths are also characterised with elevated levels of IgE antibodies.

== See also ==
- Idiotype
