= Niels Kaj Jerne =

Danish immunologist (1911–1994)

- Niels Kaj Jerne in 1950
- Born: 23 December 1911; London, UK
- Died: 7 October 1994 (aged 82); Castillon-du-Gard, France
- Known for: Monoclonal antibodies
- Awards: Gairdner Foundation International Award (1970); Marcel Benoist Prize (1978); Nobel Prize in Physiology or Medicine (1984)
- Scientific career
- Fields: Immunology

Niels Kaj Jerne, FRS (23 December 1911 – 7 October 1994) was a Danish immunologist. He shared the Nobel Prize in Physiology or Medicine in 1984 with Georges J. F. Köhler and César Milstein "for theories concerning the specificity in development and control of the immune system and the discovery of the principle for production of monoclonal antibodies".

Jerne is known for three significant ideas. Firstly, instead of the body producing antibodies in response to an antigen, Jerne postulated that the immune system already has the specific antibodies it needs to fight antigens. Secondly, it was known that the immune system learns to be tolerant to the individual's own self. Jerne postulated that this learning takes place in the thymus. Thirdly, it was known that T cells and B cells communicate with each other.

Jerne's network theory proposed that the active sites of antibodies are attracted to both specific antigens (idiotypes) and to other antibodies that bind to the same site. The antibodies are in balance, until an antigen disturbs the balance, stimulating an immune reaction.

== Early years and education ==
His ancestors had lived on the small Danish island of Fanø for centuries, but in 1910 his parents moved to London, where Jerne was born in 1911.

During the First World War, his parents moved to the Netherlands and Jerne spent his youth in Rotterdam. After studying physics for two years at the Leiden University, Jerne moved to Copenhagen and changed his studies to the field of medicine. He graduated from the University of Copenhagen with a degree in medicine in 1947. Four years later, he was awarded the doctorate for his thesis, A Study of Avidity Based on Rabbit Skin Responses to Diphtheria Toxin-Antitoxin Mixtures.

== Research positions ==
From 1943 to 1956 Jerne was a research worker at the Danish National Serum Institute and during this time he formulated a theory on antibody formation. It is said that Jerne got his revolutionary scientific idea while bicycling across the Langebro bridge in Copenhagen on his way home from work.

The antibody formation theory gave Jerne international recognition and in 1956 Jerne went to work for the World Health Organization in Geneva, where he served as the Head of the Sections of Biological Standards and of Immunology. He held this post for six years until moving to the United States and the University of Pittsburgh in 1962 to work as Professor of Microbiology and Chairman of the Department of Microbiology for four years. Jerne continued to do work for the World Health Organization as a member of the Expert Advisory Panel of Immunology from 1962 and onwards.

In 1966 Jerne moved back to Europe and took up the position of Professor of Experimental Therapy at the Johann Wolfgang Goethe University in Frankfurt. From 1966 to 1969 he was the Director of the Paul-Ehrlich-Institut, also in Frankfurt. In 1969 Jerne again switched jobs, this time to Basel in Switzerland, where he was the Director of the Basel Institute for Immunology until his retirement in 1980. During the 1970s and 1980s, Jerne was a pioneer in the development of immune network theory. It was met by skepticism among his colleagues at first, James Watson for example told Jerne bluntly that his theory "stinks".

== Family life ==
Jerne was married three times. He had two sons, Ivar Jerne (born 1936) and Donald Jerne (born 1941), with Tjek Jerne, a painter. Jerne had a third son, Andreas Wettstein, with Gertrud Wettstein, in 1971.

== Awards and honours ==
- Nobel Prize in Physiology or Medicine (1984)
- Marcel Benoist Prize (1978)
- Paul Ehrlich and Ludwig Darmstaedter Prize (1982)

He was awarded honorary doctorates from

- University of Chicago (1972)
- Columbia University (1978)
- University of Copenhagen (1979)
- University of Basel (1981)
- Erasmus University Rotterdam (1983)

He was a member of

- Foreign Honorary Member of the American Academy of Arts and Sciences (1967)
- Member of the Royal Danish Academy of Sciences and Letters (1969)
- Scandinavian Society for Immunology Honorary Member (1970)
- Foreign Associate of the National Academy of Sciences (1975)
- Foreign Member of the American Philosophical Society (1979)
- Elected a Fellow of the Royal Society (FRS) in 1980
- Member of the Académie des Sciences (1981)

== Bibliography ==
- Jerne, Niels K. (8 December 1984). "The Generative Grammar of the Immune System" (PDF). NobelPrize.org. Nobel Prize Outreach.
- Jerne, N. K. (1955). "The Natural-Selection Theory of Antibody Formation" (PDF). Proceedings of the National Academy of Sciences of the United States of America. 41 (11): 849–857. Bibcode:1955PNAS...41..849J. doi:10.1073/pnas.41.11.849. PMC 534292. PMID 16589759.
- Jerne, N. K. (1974). "Towards a network theory of the immune system". Annales d'immunologie. 125C (1–2): 373–389. PMID 4142565.
- Hoffmann, G.W. (1994), "Niels Jerne, Immunologist 1911–1994", Vaccine Research, 3, Mary Ann Liebert, Inc.: 173–174, archived from the original on 6 October 2014.
- Lefkovits, Ivan (1996). Portrait of the Immune System: Scientific Publications of Niels Kaj Jerne. World Scientific Series in 20th Century Biology. Vol. 2. Singapore: World Scientific Publishing Co. doi:10.1142/3052. ISBN 978-9810226145.
