= Dermal macrophage =

Skin macrophages used for wound repair and hair growth

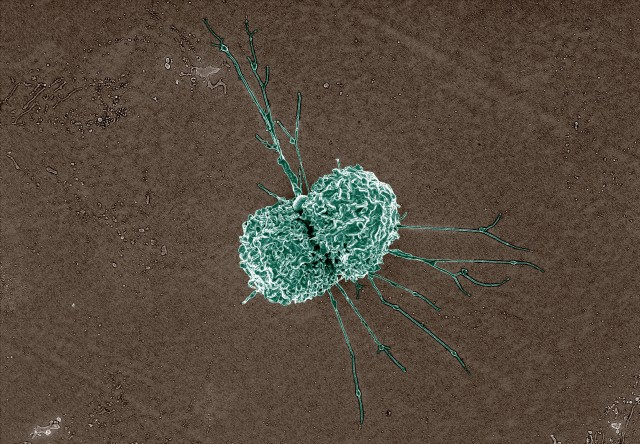
An electron micrograph of a macrophage. This is the general morphology of macrophages.

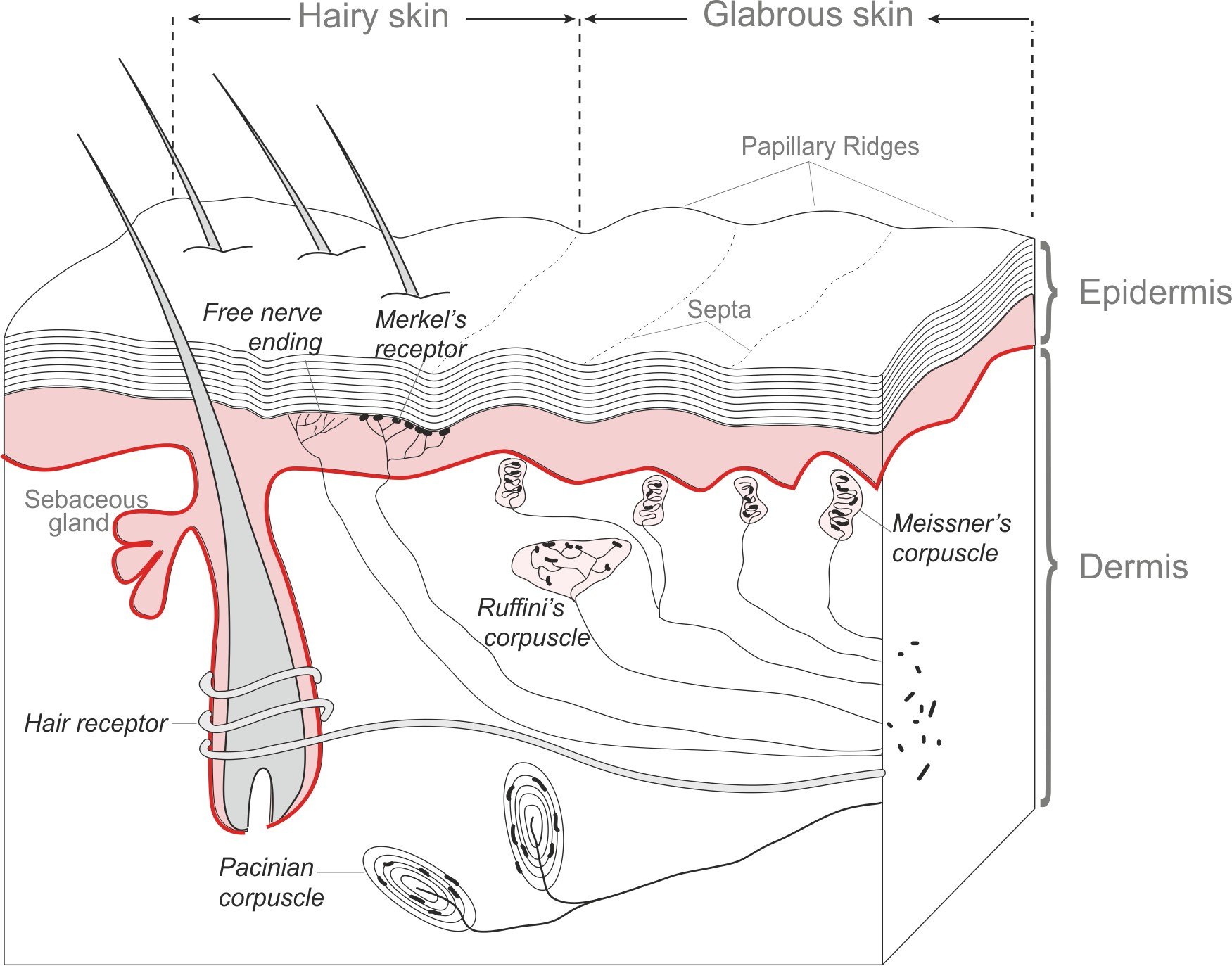
The anatomy of human skin. Dermal macrophages are usually present in the dermis and around hair follicles.

Dermal macrophages are macrophages in the skin that facilitate skin homeostasis by mediating wound repair, hair growth, and salt balance. Their functional role in these processes is the mediator of inflammation. They can acquire an M1 or M2 phenotype to promote or suppress an inflammatory response, thereby influencing other cells' activity via the production of pro-inflammatory or anti-inflammatory cytokines. Dermal macrophages' ability to acquire pro-inflammatory properties also potentiates them in cancer defence. M1 macrophages can suppress tumour growth in the skin by their pro-inflammatory properties. However, M2 macrophages support tumour growth and invasion by the production of Th2 cytokines such as TGFβ and IL-10. Thus, the exact contribution of each phenotype to cancer defence and the skin's homeostasis is still unclear.

Dermal macrophages are native immune cells mainly located in the dermis of the skin. They consist of two distinct populations: yolk-sac derived precursors or circulating monocytes. They are tissue-resident phagocytes that facilitate microbial debris clearance in the skin.

Dermal macrophages belong to the mononuclear phagocyte system that serves a vital role in the innate immunity of the skin. They are also a type of antigen-presenting cells (APCs) that can mediate the infiltration of immune cells during an immune response, suggesting dermal macrophages' influence on both the innate and adaptive immune systems. However, their antigen-presenting ability is relatively lower than dendritic cells (DCs) and Langerhans cells (LCs) in the skin. Thus, their primary function is the homeostasis of the skin.

== Development ==
Dermal macrophages are either from embryonic progenitors or circulating progenitors. Numerous dermal macrophages are present in the skin at birth due to the infiltration of yolk-sac derived macrophages and haematopoietic stem cell (HSC)-derived monocytes. The prenatal population of dermal macrophages is gradually replaced by the recruitment and differentiation of circulating progenitors in adulthood. Prenatal dermal macrophages are not to be confused with Langerhans cells as they uniquely express CD14 and FXIIIa and lack CD1a.

=== Prenatal development ===
The prenatal portion of tissue-resident dermal macrophages is produced from yolk-sac derived precursors. The generation of dermal macrophages results from primitive haematopoiesis or definitive haematopoiesis.

Primitive haematopoiesis allows the generation of yolk-sac derived macrophages and subsequent release into the foetal bloodstream for tissue infiltration and colonisation. The infiltration of the skin by yolk-sac derived macrophages occurs as soon as 8.5 days after fertilisation. Different gene expressions regulate this process. It is independent of the MYB gene and dependent on the PU.1 gene.

Definitive haematopoiesis occurs from 11 days and onwards after fertilisation. Monocytes are produced from haematopoietic stem cells in the liver, and they subsequently infiltrate the skin via the foetal bloodstream. In this process, cytokines like CSF1 are essential in facilitating the differentiation of monocytes into tissue-resident dermal macrophages and their survival. Therefore, the differentiation of monocytes to dermal macrophages is CSF-1/CSF1R dependent.

The level of dermal macrophages from prenatal development remains detectible through constant, slow proliferation.

=== Postnatal development ===
The postnatal population of dermal macrophages is achieved by the infiltration of circulating monocytes given proper CCR2 signalling, a pathway responding to chemokines. The infiltration of circulating monocytes can also be triggered through the upregulation of pro-inflammatory cytokines and chemicals such as sodium chloride.

The infiltration of bone-marrow-derived monocytes generated postnatally creates a distinct population of dermal macrophages. They are LY6C^{hi} monocytes, a type of circulating monocyte in the blood. The entry of LY6C^{hi} monocytes to the dermis is CCR2-pathway-dependent. Their subsequent differentiation will create the postnatal population. The generation of dermal macrophages is highlighted by the expression of cell markers such as CD64, MERTK and the downregulation of CCR2.

== Function ==
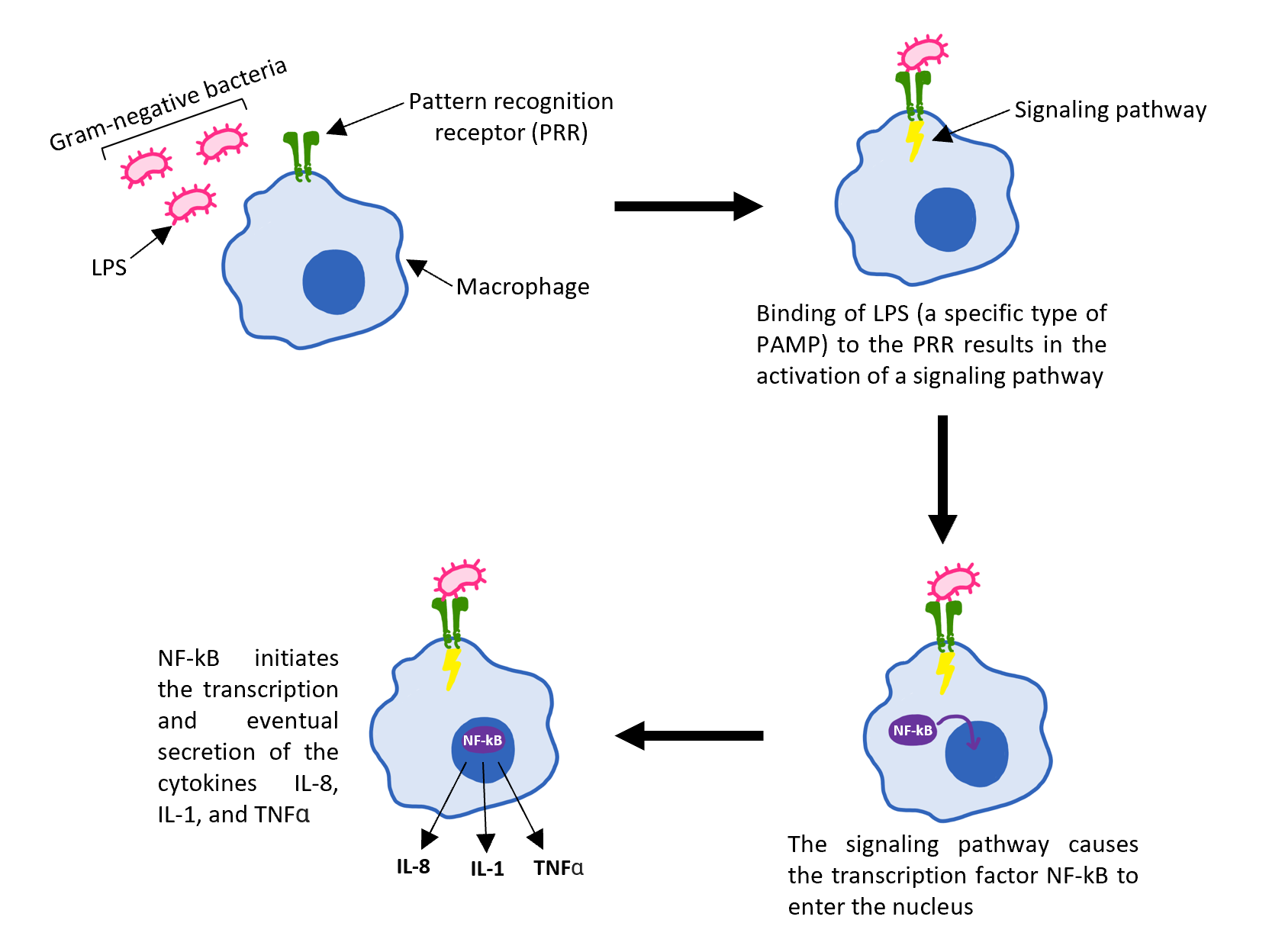
Macrophages detect foreign substances and trigger an immune response via the release of various pro-inflammatory chemicals.

=== Innate immunity ===
Dermal macrophages can phagocytose and digest foreign substances similar to other cell types in the mononuclear phagocyte system. They construct the mononuclear phagocyte system together with dendritic and Langerhans cells.

Dermal macrophages have a distinct expression of genes to facilitate their specialisation in removing macromolecules and foreign pathogens. Therefore, they cannot infiltrate the lymph nodes because of their unique roles. For instance, the cell population near postcapillary venules expresses CD4. This specific population can produce chemokines to mediate the infiltration of neutrophils in an inflammatory response. Dermal macrophages' functions suggest their importance in the skin's innate immunity.

Dermal macrophages, Langerhans cells and dendritic cells are the main types of antigen-presenting cells (APCs) in the skin. However, dermal macrophages have a relatively lower influence on antigen-presenting than other APCs. Thus, dermal macrophages mainly serve as phagocytes in removing foreign substances.

=== Wound repair ===
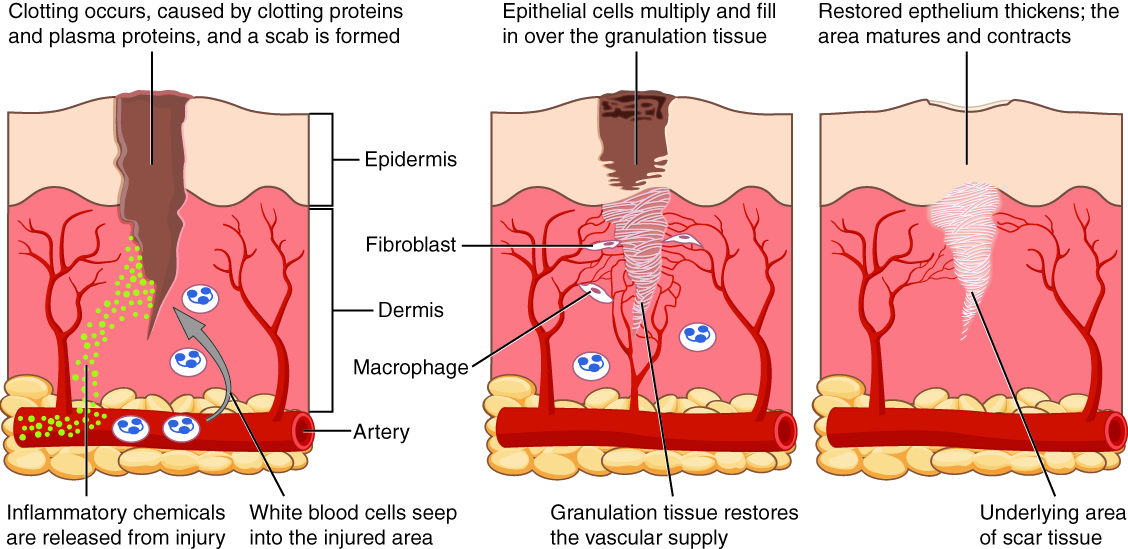
The infiltration of white blood cells and activation of dermal macrophages mediated by the release of pro-inflammatory chemicals can facilitate the wound healing process.

Dermal macrophages are primarily populated in the dermis of the skin as they are specialised in skin homeostasis and repair. There are three inter-linked stages in skin wound healing: inflammation, tissue formation, and maturation. Dermal macrophages serve the function of bridging the three stages of wound healing.

The first stage occurs from day 0 to 5 post-injury. This stage is an inflammatory response induced by dermal macrophages to initiate the tissue repairing process. Similar to their functions in innate immunity, dermal macrophages stimulate an inflammatory response during the first stage of wound repair by releasing pro-inflammatory factors. This allows infiltration of immune cells and factors facilitating tissue regeneration. Dermal macrophages are associated with the production of proliferation factors such as TGFβ1 and VEGF-A. The factors are produced to initiate the second stage, tissue formation.

Tissue formation occurs from day 5 to 10 post-injury. In this stage, dermal macrophages' primary role is to generate a primary structure for wound repairing via granulation and collagen deposition. They also mediate re-epithelialisation and neo-angiogenesis by producing TGFβ1 and VEGF-A, as in the inflammation stage. Dermal macrophages are essential in the transition between the second and third stages. Deficiency in dermal macrophages might induce unfavourable morphological changes in the wound because of compromised removal of tissue debris via phagocytosis.

Dermal macrophages mediate the final stage of tissue maturation and wound remodelling. They are non-essential contributors that facilitate the replacement of type I collagen to type III collagen. Wound retraction occurs in this stage, in which the proliferation factors TGFβ1 and VEGF-A, mainly produced by dermal macrophages, are reduced to facilitate the process. There will be a gradual reduction in an inflammatory response in the wound through the secretion of proliferation factors. Anti-inflammatory dermal macrophages are also activated to alleviate the inflammation as healing reaches completion. They express IL-10 and IL-1Ra to suppress inflammation.

=== Hair growth ===
Dermal macrophages are the essential component of the hair follicle immune system. They generally facilitate hair growth. There are three steps of hair growth: anagen, catagen, and telogen. During catagen, dermal macrophages' population decreases progressively when the hair grows. The number of dermal macrophages in hair follicles reaches a minimum during telogen (resting state) and increases during anagen (beginning of another growth cycle).

In rodents, perifollicular macrophages can actively remove collagen fibres around the follicles via phagocytosis. This phenomenon might contribute to remodelling the follicular composition during anagen when dermal macrophages prevent the activation of follicular stem cells, thereby preventing entry to catagen, a process in which hair stops growing. Hence, dermal macrophages facilitate the growth of the hair by preventing the halt of the growth process and its regression.

When under physical stress, the release of CCL2 (cytokine) in the hair follicle induces the infiltration of macrophages. The infiltrated macrophages mainly express an M1 phenotype, which are pro-inflammatory macrophages that could trigger apoptosis of cells in the follicle by their upregulation of pro-inflammatory cytokines such as TNF-a. However, TNF-a is a major factor facilitating hair regeneration by promoting various pathways' signalling (Wnt, NF-κB pathway).

Dermal macrophages could also contribute to hair regeneration by skewing towards the anti-inflammatory phenotype (M2) under minor stress. However, M2 dermal macrophages might also arrest the hair growth cycle at telogen. Further research is needed to determine the functional roles of M2 dermal macrophages. Although the contribution of M1 and M2 dermal macrophages to hair regeneration is still unclear, the contribution of the dermal macrophage population is still noticeable regardless of their phenotypes.

=== Salt balance ===
Dermal macrophages facilitate skin homeostasis by regulating the skin's salt composition. For instance, an increase in salt concentration after a salt-heavy meal attracts dermal macrophages that express TonEBP, a transcriptional factor responding to osmotic pressure changes. This process triggers VEGF-C transcription, resulting in the growth of lymph capillaries and blood vessels dilation, regulating salt-sensitive hypertension by lowering the blood pressure. An increase in sodium ions concentration also facilitates the polymerisation of glycosaminoglycans, which helps the storage of sodium ions in the skin.

A salt solution such as sodium chloride in the skin can trigger hypertonic stress, which acts as a stimulus for attracting macrophages. A higher salt concentration also causes macrophages activation. It induces the expression of pro-inflammatory genes such as CXCL-1, CCL2, and IL-1 and inhibits anti-inflammatory genes such as CCL18 and CCL22. Hence, the activation of dermal macrophages can be achieved by the local salt concentration, independent of the salt ingested. The expression of such genes could contribute to the skin's defence against parasitic infections.

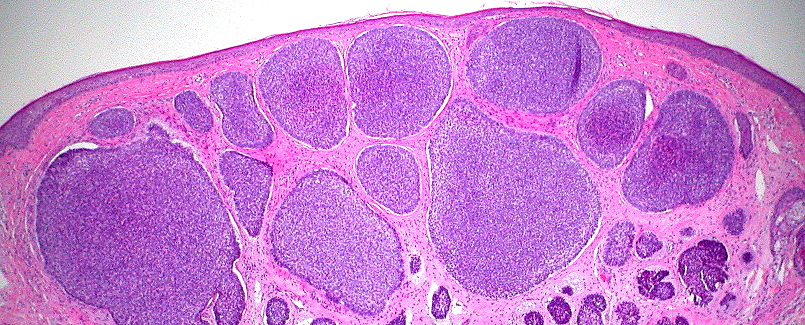
Micrograph of basal cell carcinoma of a man's forehead (H&E staining). The cells with a darker colour are cancer cells.

=== Cancer resistance ===
Dermal macrophages can adjust their phenotypes to increase or suppress skin inflammation by different gene profiles, which can slow down the development of certain cancers. For instance, they can suppress the development of basal cell carcinoma. Basal cell carcinoma is induced by mutations in PTCH1, a tumour-suppressor protein, leading to uncontrollable cell growth. In rodents, there is increased growth of basal cell carcinoma and loss of normal cells without the presence of macrophages. Therefore, dermal macrophages are associated with cancer defence.

== Interaction with other cells ==
The phenotypes of dermal macrophages can be affected by the cytokines expressed by other immune cells. They can obtain a pro-inflammatory (M1) or anti-inflammatory (M2) phenotype. Cytokines such as IFN-γ skew dermal macrophages to the M1 phenotype, while IL-4 and IL-13 skew them to the M2 phenotype. Phenotype acquisition is the hallmark of macrophage activation.

Activation of dermal macrophages can also be achieved by direct contact. Ligands such as CD4 on T cells can trigger dermal macrophages to release pro-inflammatory cytokines during inflammation. This process also preserves the population of circulating monocytes and thereby increases their activity.

Dermal macrophages are involved in the adaptive immune system due to their antigen-presenting ability. Dermal macrophages' expression of cell markers like CD11b, F4/80 and MHC II indicate their participation in the MHC II antigen-presenting pathway. However, the MHC II expression is low compared to Langerhans cells, rendering dermal macrophages minor contributors to antigen presentation.

== Clinical significance ==
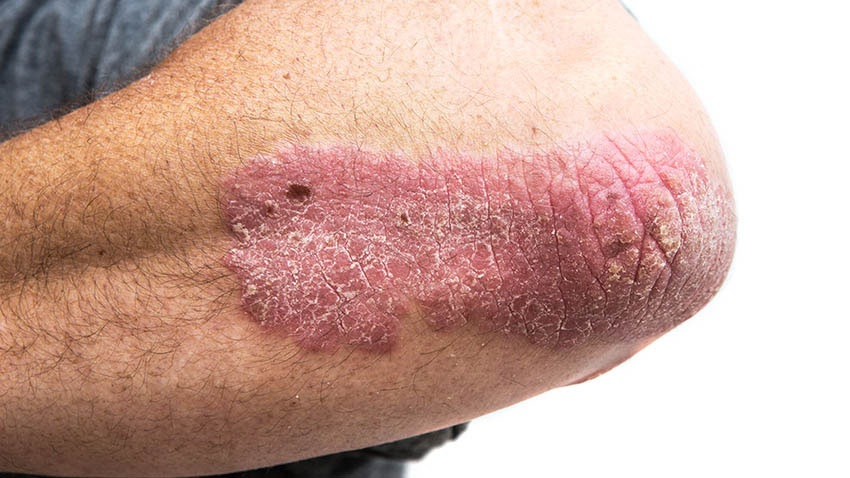
Skin lesion on a patient's elbow with psoriasis.

=== Psoriasis ===
Pro-inflammatory (M1) macrophages are responsible for the progression of psoriasis. They are mainly derived from infiltrated monocytes. M1 macrophages' population could be as high as 60% of all the infiltrated immune cells during the disease onset. They are the primary source of TNF-a, which leads to lesion development when there is a prolonged production of

TNF-a. TNF-a could also trigger M1 polarisation, which leads to further exaggeration of the disease. M1 macrophage ablation via adalimumab administration could alleviate psoriasis.

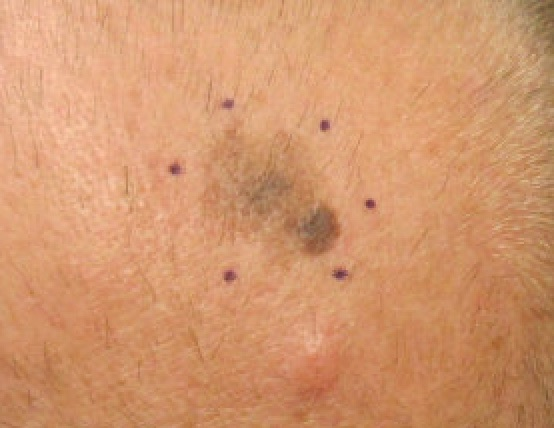
Melanoma on a person's scalp.

=== Melanoma ===
Tumour-associated macrophages can be attracted by cytokines such as TGF-β and IL-10 produced by tumours in melanoma. These cytokines can also trigger the M2 polarisation of the infiltrated tumour-associated macrophages. Infiltrated macrophages that acquire the M2 phenotype are anti-inflammatory. They facilitate tumour growth and proliferation via immunosuppression, further cytokine production, and tumour angiogenesis. Tumour-associated macrophages also promote the invasion of cancer cells via the production of miRNA exosomes.

=== Diabetes and obesity ===
Lacking anti-inflammatory dermal macrophages in diabetic patients results in impaired wound healing ability. Dermal macrophages are arrested at the pro-inflammatory phenotype, which increases the difficulty in the healing process due to their production of pro-inflammatory cytokines. Ulcers on foot are common in a patient with severe diabetes due to the prolonged impairment of wound healing.

Pro-inflammatory (M1) macrophages are also frequently observed in obese individuals' subcutaneous tissues. This is related to the progression of diabetes with chronic adipose tissue inflammation. However, the explicit roles of dermal macrophages in obesity are still unclear.

== See also ==
- Skin
- Hair follicle
- Macrophage
- Dendritic cell
- Langerhans cell
- Macrophage polarisation
- Inflammation
- Phenotypes of macrophages
- Phagocytosis
- Angiogenesis
- Melanoma
- Basal cell carcinoma
