= Regulatory macrophages =

Macrophage subset

Regulatory macrophages (Mregs) represent a subset of anti-inflammatory macrophages. In general, macrophages are a very dynamic and plastic cell type and can be divided into two main groups: classically activated macrophages (M1) and alternatively activated macrophages (M2). M2 group can further be divided into sub-groups M2a, M2b, M2c, and M2d. Typically the M2 cells have anti-inflammatory and regulatory properties and produce many different anti-inflammatory cytokines such as IL-4, IL-33, IL-10, IL-1RA, and TGF-β. M2 cells can also secrete angiogenic and chemotactic factors. These cells can be distinguished based on the different expression levels of various surface proteins and the secretion of different effector molecules.

M2a, mainly known as alternatively activated macrophages, are macrophages associated with tissue healing due to the production of components of extracellular matrix. M2a cells are induced by IL-4 and IL-13. M2b, generally referred to as regulatory macrophages (Mregs), are characterized by secreting large amounts of IL-10 and small amounts of IL-12. M2c, also known as deactivated macrophages, secrete large amounts of IL-10 and TGF-β. M2c are induced by glucocorticoids and TGF-β. M2d are pro-angiogenic cells that secrete IL-10, TGF-β, and vascular endothelial growth factor and are induced by IL-6 and A2 adenosine receptor agonist (A2R).

== Mreg origin and induction ==
Mregs can arise following innate or adaptive immune responses. Mregs were first described after FcγR ligation by IgG complexes in the occurrence of pathogen-associated molecular patterns (e. g. lipopolysaccharide or lipoteichoic acid) acting through Toll-like receptors. Coculture of macrophages with regulatory T cells (Tregs) caused differentiation of macrophages toward Mreg phenotype. Similar effect provoked interaction of macrophages and B1 B cells. Mregs can even arise following stress responses. Activation of the hypothalamic-pituitary-adrenal axis leads to production of glucocorticoids that cause decreased production of IL-12 by macrophages.

Many cell types including monocytes, M1, and M2 can in a specific microenvironment differentiate to Mregs. Induction of Mregs is strongly linked with the interaction of Fc receptors located on the surface of Mregs with Fc fragments of antibodies. It has been shown that anti-TNF monoclonal antibodies interacting with Fcγ receptor of Mregs induce differentiation of Mregs through activation of STAT3 signaling pathway. Some pathogens can promote the transformation of cells into Mregs as an immune evasion mechanism. Two signals are needed for Mregs inducement. The first signal is stimulation by M-CSF, GM-CSF, PGE2, adenosine, glucocorticoid, or apoptotic cells. The second signal can be stimulation with cytokines or toll-like receptor ligands. The first signal promotes the differentiation of monocytes to macrophages and the second signal promotes immunosuppressive functions. In vitro, M-CSF, IFNγ, and LPS are used for the inducement of Mregs.

Other cells such as eosinophils and innate lymphoid cells type 2 (ILC2) can promote M2 polarization by cytokine secretion. IL-9 can function as a growth factor for ILC-2 and thereby assist in the induction of Mregs. Another cytokine that helps the induction of Mregs is IL-35 which is produced by Tregs.

== Characterization and determination of Mregs ==
Surprisingly, Mregs resemble classically activated macrophages more than alternatively activated macrophages, due to higher biochemical similarity. The difference between M1 macrophages and Mregs is, inter alia, that Mregs secrete high levels of IL-10 and simultaneously low levels of IL-12. Out of all macrophages, Mregs show the highest expression of MHC II molecules and co-stimulatory molecules (CD80/CD86), which differentiates them from the alternatively activated macrophages, which show a very low expression of these molecules. Mregs also differ from alternatively activated macrophages by producing high levels of nitric oxide and low arginase activity. Lastly, they differ in the expression of FIIZ1 (Resistin-like molecule alpha1) and YM1 which are differentiation markers present on alternatively activated macrophages. Mregs are recognized by the expression of PD-L1, CD206, CD80/CD86, HLA-DR, and DHRS9 (dehydrogenase/reductase 9). DHRS9 has been recognized as a stable marker for Mregs in humans.

== Biochemical and functional characterization of Mregs ==
The physiological role of Mregs is to dampen the immune response and immunopathology. Unlike classically activated macrophages, Mregs produce low levels of IL-12, which is important because IL-12 induces differentiation of naïve helper T cells to Th1 cells which produce high levels of IFNγ. Mregs do not contribute to the production of extracellular matrix because they express low levels of arginase.

Mregs show up-regulation of IL-10, TGFβ, PGE2, iNOS, IDO, and down-regulation of IL-1β, IL-6, IL-12, and TNF-α. By secreting TGF-β they help with the induction of Tregs and by producing IL-10 they contribute to the induction of tolerance and regulatory cell types. Mregs can directly inhibit the proliferation of activated T cells. It has been shown that Mregs co-cultured with T cells have a negative effect on the T-cellular ability to secrete IL-2 and IFN-γ. Mregs can also inhibit the arginase activity of alternatively activated macrophages, the proliferation of fibroblasts, and can promote angiogenesis. The use of Mregs is widely studied as a potential cell-based immunosuppressive therapy after organ transplantation. Mregs could potentially solve the problems (susceptibility to infectious diseases and cancer diseases) associated with the current post-transplant therapy. Since Mregs are still producing nitric oxide they may be more suitable than current treatments, when appropriately stimulated.
