= Macrophage =

Type of white blood cell

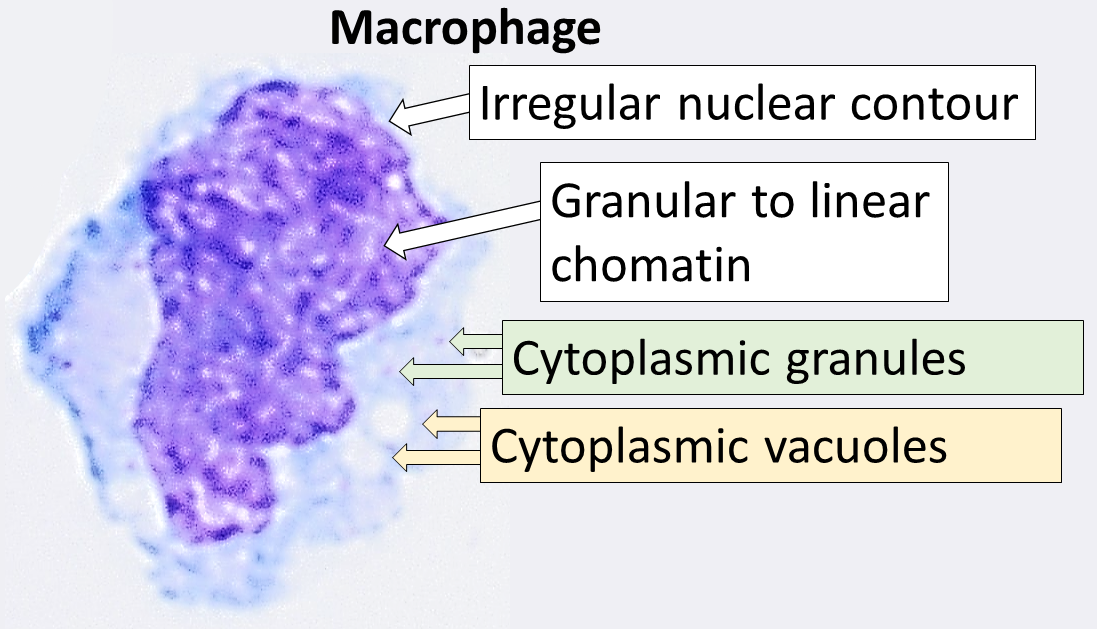
- Cytology of a macrophage with typical features; Wright's stain

Details
- Pronunciation: /ˈmakrə(ʊ)feɪdʒ/
- System: Immune system
- Function: Phagocytosis

Identifiers
- Latin: macrophagocytus
- Acronym(s): Mφ, MΦ
- MeSH: D008264
- TH: H2.00.03.0.01007
- FMA: 63261

Macrophages (/ˈmækroʊfeɪdʒ/) are a type of white blood cell of the innate immune system that engulf and digest pathogens, such as cancer cells, microbes, cellular debris and foreign substances, which do not have proteins that are specific to healthy body cells on their surface. This self-protection method can be contrasted with that employed by natural killer cells. This process of engulfment and digestion is called phagocytosis; it acts to defend the host against infection and injury.

Macrophages are found in essentially all tissues, where they patrol for potential pathogens by amoeboid movement. They take various forms (with various names) throughout the body (e.g., histiocytes, Kupffer cells, alveolar macrophages, microglia, and others), but all are part of the mononuclear phagocyte system. Besides phagocytosis, they play a critical role in nonspecific defense (innate immunity) and also help initiate specific defense mechanisms (adaptive immunity) by recruiting other immune cells such as lymphocytes. For example, they are important as antigen presenters to T cells. In humans, dysfunctional macrophages cause severe diseases such as chronic granulomatous disease that result in frequent infections.

Beyond increasing inflammation and stimulating the immune system, macrophages also play an important anti-inflammatory role and can decrease immune reactions through the release of cytokines. Macrophages that encourage inflammation are called M1 macrophages, whereas those that decrease inflammation and encourage tissue repair are called M2 macrophages. This difference is reflected in their metabolism; M1 macrophages have the unique ability to metabolize arginine to the "killer" molecule nitric oxide, whereas M2 macrophages have the unique ability to metabolize arginine to the "repair" molecule ornithine. However, this dichotomy has been recently questioned as further complexity has been discovered. Macrophages are widely thought of as highly plastic and fluid cells, with a fluctuating phenotype.

Human macrophages are about 21 micrometres (0.00083 in) in diameter and are produced by the differentiation of monocytes in tissues. They can be identified using flow cytometry or immunohistochemical staining by their specific expression of proteins such as CD14, CD40, CD11b, CD64, F4/80 (mice)/EMR1 (human), lysozyme M, MAC-1/MAC-3 and CD68.

Macrophages were first discovered and named by Élie Metchnikoff, a Russian Empire zoologist, in 1884.

== Structure ==
=== Types ===
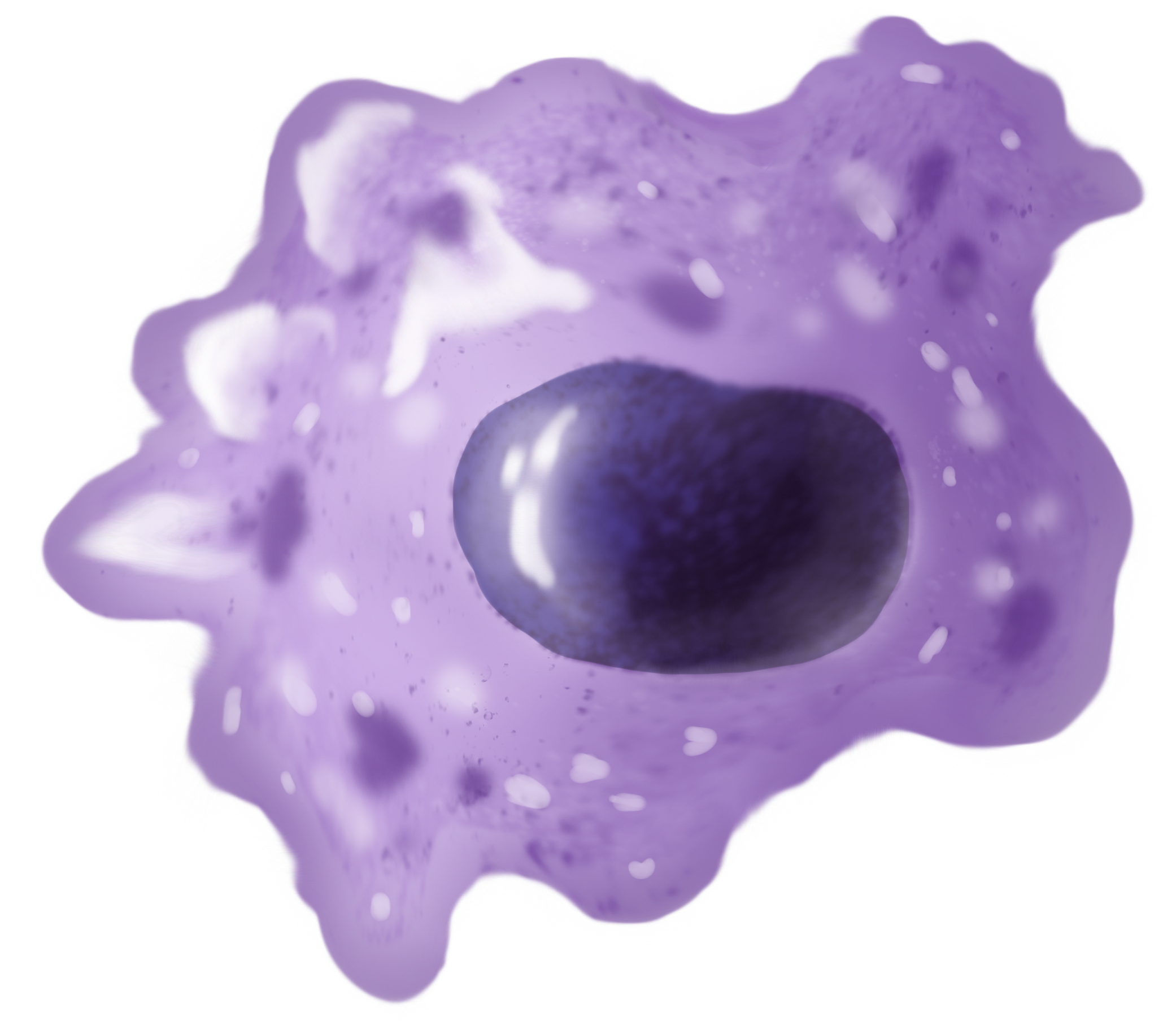
Drawing of a macrophage when fixed and stained by giemsa dye

A majority of macrophages are stationed at strategic points where microbial invasion or accumulation of foreign particles is likely to occur. These cells together as a group are known as the mononuclear phagocyte system and were previously known as the reticuloendothelial system. Each type of macrophage, determined by its location, has a specific name:

| Cell Name | Anatomical Location |
| Adipose tissue macrophages | Adipose tissue (fat) |
| Monocytes | Bone marrow / blood |
| Kupffer cells | Liver |
| Sinus histiocytes | Lymph nodes |
| Alveolar macrophages (dust cells) | Pulmonary alveoli |
| Tissue macrophages (histiocytes) leading to giant cells | Connective tissue |
| Microglia | Central nervous system |
| Hofbauer cells | Placenta |
| Intraglomerular mesangial cells | Kidney |
| Osteoclasts | Bone |
| Dermal macrophages and Langerhans cells | Skin |
| Epithelioid cells | Granulomas |
| Red pulp macrophages (sinusoidal lining cells) | Red pulp of spleen |
| Peritoneal macrophages | Peritoneal cavity |
| Perivascular macrophages | Closely associated with blood vessels |

Investigations concerning Kupffer cells are hampered because in humans, Kupffer cells are only accessible for immunohistochemical analysis from biopsies or autopsies. From rats and mice, they are difficult to isolate, and after purification, only approximately 5 million cells can be obtained from one mouse.

Macrophages can express paracrine functions within organs that are specific to the function of that organ. In the testis, for example, macrophages have been shown to be able to interact with Leydig cells by secreting 25-hydroxycholesterol, an oxysterol that can be converted to testosterone by neighbouring Leydig cells. Also, testicular macrophages may participate in creating an immune privileged environment in the testis, and in mediating infertility during inflammation of the testis.

Cardiac resident macrophages participate in electrical conduction via gap junction communication with cardiac myocytes.

Macrophages can be classified on basis of the fundamental function and activation. According to this grouping, there are classically activated (M1) macrophages, wound-healing macrophages (also known as alternatively-activated (M2) macrophages), and regulatory macrophages (Mregs).

== Development ==
Macrophages that reside in adult healthy tissues either derive from circulating monocytes or are established before birth and then maintained during adult life independently of monocytes. By contrast, most of the macrophages that accumulate at diseased sites typically derive from circulating monocytes. Leukocyte extravasation describes monocyte entry into damaged tissue through the endothelium of blood vessels as they become macrophages. Monocytes are attracted to a damaged site by chemical substances through chemotaxis, triggered by a range of stimuli including damaged cells, pathogens and cytokines released by macrophages already at the site. At some sites such as the testis, macrophages have been shown to populate the organ through proliferation. Unlike short-lived neutrophils, macrophages survive longer in the body, up to several months.

== Function ==
Steps of a macrophage ingesting a pathogen: a. Ingestion through phagocytosis, a phagosome is formed b. The fusion of lysosomes with the phagosome creates a phagolysosome; the pathogen is broken down by enzymes c. Waste material is expelled or assimilated (the latter not pictured) Parts: 1. Pathogens; 2. Phagosome; 3. Lysosomes; 4. Waste material; 5. Cytoplasm; 6. Cell membrane

=== Phagocytosis ===
Macrophages are professional phagocytes and are highly specialized in removal of dying or dead cells and cellular debris. This role is important in chronic inflammation, as the early stages of inflammation are dominated by neutrophils, which expend themselves and are ingested by macrophages. Macrophages normally present themselves at the wound site within 2 days following the injury.

The neutrophils are at first attracted to a site, where they perform their function and die, before they or their neutrophil extracellular traps are phagocytized by the macrophages. The first wave of neutrophils acts for approximately 2 days at the site and signals to attract macrophages. These macrophages will then ingest the aged neutrophils.

The removal of dying cells is, to a greater extent, handled by fixed macrophages, which will stay at strategic locations such as the lungs, liver, neural tissue, bone, spleen and connective tissue, ingesting foreign materials such as pathogens and recruiting additional macrophages if needed. The phagocytosis and clearance of apoptotic remains is called efferocytosis and is also carried out by other cell types, not all of which are professional phagocytes.

When a macrophage ingests a pathogen, the pathogen becomes trapped in a phagosome, which then fuses with a lysosome. Within the phagolysosome, enzymes and toxic peroxides digest the pathogen. However, some bacteria (such as Mycobacterium tuberculosis) have become resistant to these methods of digestion. Typhoidal Salmonellae induce their own phagocytosis by host macrophages in vivo and inhibit digestion by lysosomal action, thereby using macrophages for their own replication and causing macrophage apoptosis. Macrophages are capable of engulfing and digesting many bacteria during their life. They can die eventually due to factors including pathogenic cytotoxicity, oxidative stress, and phagocytosis-induced apoptosis. Phagocytosis-induced apoptosis results from the powerful apoptotic stimulus of consuming bacteria and is observed in (at least) macrophages and neutrophils.

=== Role in innate immune response ===
When a pathogen invades, tissue resident macrophages are among the first cells to respond. Two of the main roles of the tissue resident macrophages are to phagocytose incoming antigen and to secrete proinflammatory cytokines that induce inflammation and recruit other immune cells to the site.

==== Phagocytosis of pathogens ====
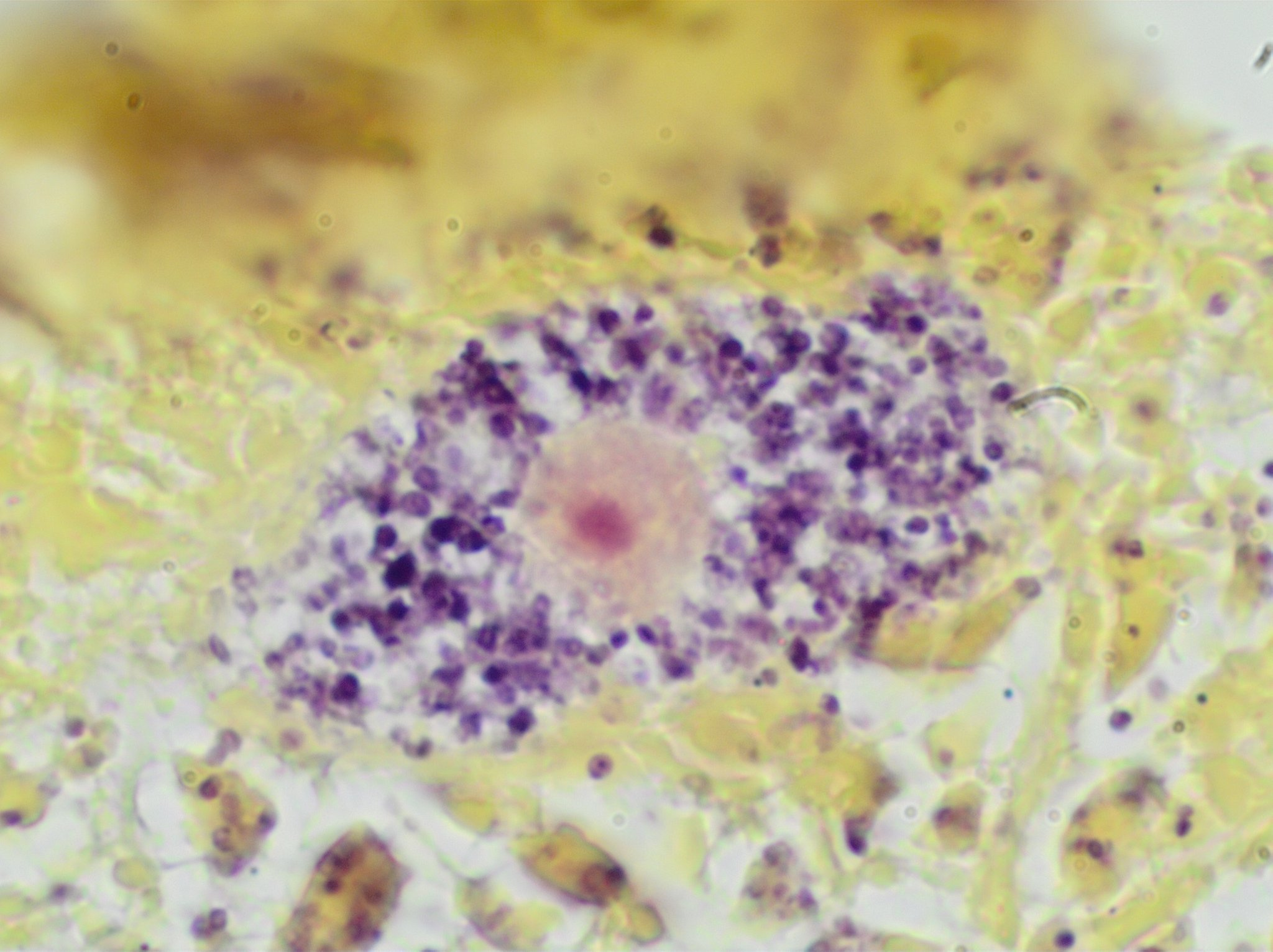
Gram stain of a macrophage with ingested S. epidermidis bacteria, seen as purple granules within its cytoplasm.

Macrophages can internalize antigens through receptor-mediated phagocytosis. Macrophages have a wide variety of pattern recognition receptors (PRRs) that can recognize microbe-associated molecular patterns (MAMPs) from pathogens. Many PRRs, such as toll-like receptors (TLRs), scavenger receptors (SRs), C-type lectin receptors, among others, recognize pathogens for phagocytosis. Macrophages can also recognize pathogens for phagocytosis indirectly through opsonins, which are molecules that attach to pathogens and mark them for phagocytosis. Opsonins can cause a stronger adhesion between the macrophage and pathogen during phagocytosis, hence opsonins tend to enhance macrophages' phagocytic activity. Both complement proteins and antibodies can bind to antigens and opsonize them. Macrophages have complement receptor 1 (CR1) and 3 (CR3) that recognize pathogen-bound complement proteins C3b and iC3b, respectively, as well as fragment crystallizable γ receptors (FcγRs) that recognize the fragment crystallizable (Fc) region of antigen-bound immunoglobulin G (IgG) antibodies. When phagocytosing and digesting pathogens, macrophages go through a respiratory burst where more oxygen is consumed to supply the energy required for producing reactive oxygen species (ROS) and other antimicrobial molecules that digest the consumed pathogens.

==== Chemical secretion ====
Recognition of MAMPs by PRRs can activate tissue resident macrophages to secrete proinflammatory cytokines that recruit other immune cells. Among the PRRs, TLRs play a major role in signal transduction leading to cytokine production. The binding of MAMPs to TLR triggers a series of downstream events that eventually activates transcription factor NF-κB and results in transcription of the genes for several proinflammatory cytokines, including IL-1β, IL-6, TNF-α, IL-12B, and type I interferons such as IFN-α and IFN-β. Systemically, IL-1β, IL-6, and TNF-α induce fever and initiate the acute phase response in which the liver secretes acute phase proteins. Locally, IL-1β and TNF-α cause vasodilation, where the gaps between blood vessel epithelial cells widen, and upregulation of cell surface adhesion molecules on epithelial cells to induce leukocyte extravasation. Additionally, activated macrophages have been found to have delayed synthesis of prostaglandins (PGs) which are important mediators of inflammation and pain. Among the PGs, anti-inflammatory PGE2 and pro-inflammatory PGD2 increase the most after activation, with PGE2 increasing expression of IL-10 and inhibiting production of TNFs via the COX-2 pathway.

Neutrophils are among the first immune cells recruited by macrophages to exit the blood via extravasation and arrive at the infection site. Macrophages secrete many chemokines such as CXCL1, CXCL2, and CXCL8 (IL-8) that attract neutrophils to the site of infection. After neutrophils have finished phagocytosing and clearing the antigen at the end of the immune response, they undergo apoptosis, and macrophages are recruited from blood monocytes to help clear apoptotic debris.

Macrophages also recruit other immune cells such as monocytes, dendritic cells, natural killer cells, basophils, eosinophils, and T cells through chemokines such as CCL2, CCL4, CCL5, CXCL8, CXCL9, CXCL10, and CXCL11. Along with dendritic cells, macrophages help activate natural killer (NK) cells through secretion of type I interferons (IFN-α and IFN-β) and IL-12. IL-12 acts with IL-18 to stimulate the production of proinflammatory cytokine interferon gamma (IFN-γ) by NK cells, which serves as an important source of IFN-γ before the adaptive immune system is activated. IFN-γ enhances the innate immune response by inducing a more aggressive phenotype in macrophages, allowing macrophages to more efficiently kill pathogens.

Some of the T cell chemoattractants secreted by macrophages include CCL5, CXCL9, CXCL10, and CXCL11.

=== Role in adaptive immunity ===
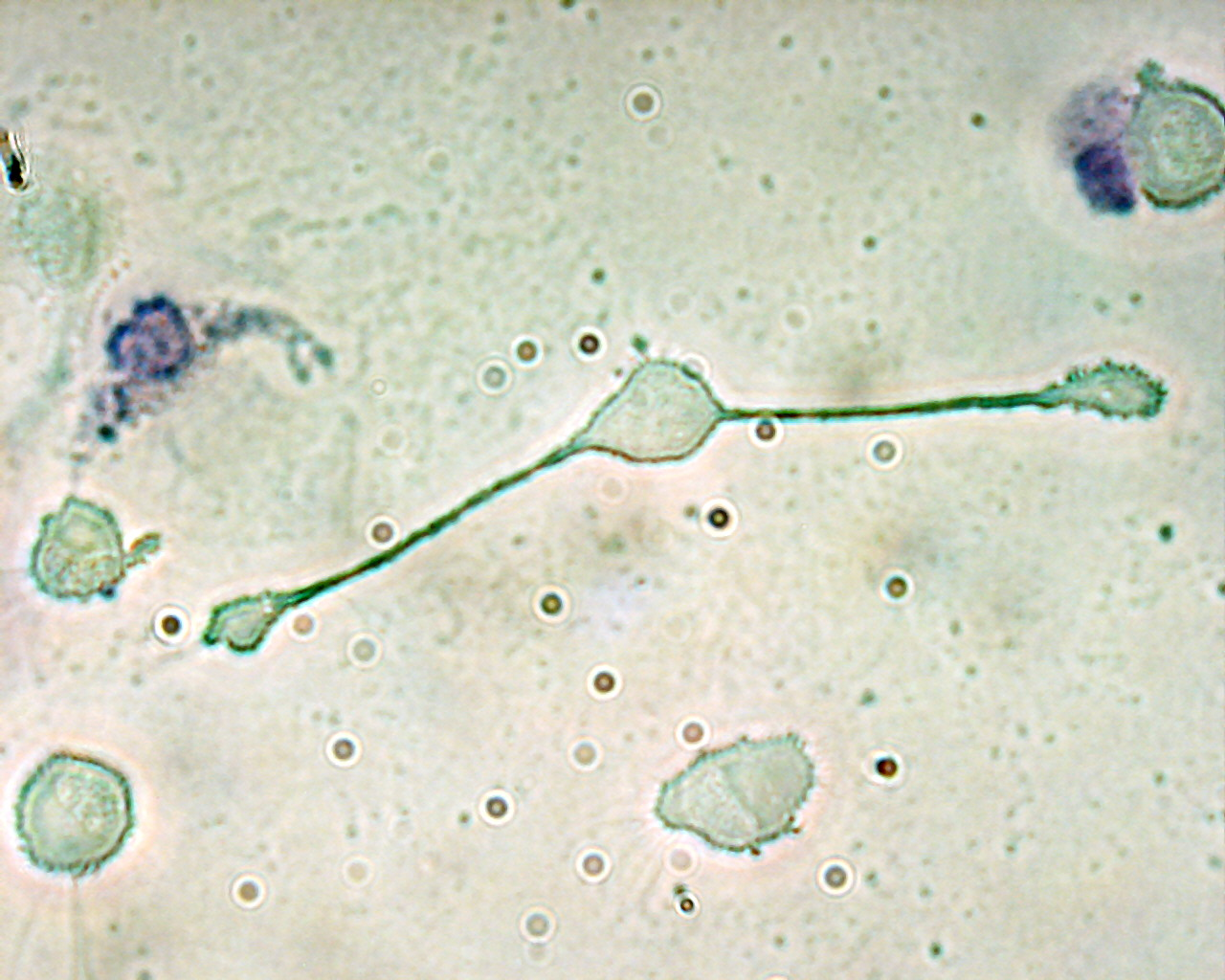
A macrophage stretching its "arms" (filopodia) to engulf two particles, possibly pathogens, in a mouse (trypan blue exclusion staining).

==== Interactions with CD4^{+} T Helper Cells ====
Macrophages are professional antigen presenting cells (APC), meaning they can present peptides from phagocytosed antigens on major histocompatibility complex (MHC) II molecules on their cell surface for T helper cells. Macrophages are not primary activators of naïve T helper cells that have never been previously activated since tissue resident macrophages do not travel to the lymph nodes where naïve T helper cells reside. Although macrophages are also found in secondary lymphoid organs like the lymph nodes, they do not reside in T cell zones and are not effective at activating naïve T helper cells. The macrophages in lymphoid tissues are more involved in ingesting antigens and preventing them from entering the blood, as well as taking up debris from apoptotic lymphocytes. Therefore, macrophages interact mostly with previously activated T helper cells that have left the lymph node and arrived at the site of infection or with tissue resident memory T cells.

Macrophages supply both signals required for T helper cell activation: 1) Macrophages present antigen peptide-bound MHC class II molecule to be recognized by the corresponding T cell receptor (TCR), and 2) recognition of pathogens by PRRs induce macrophages to upregulate the co-stimulatory molecules CD80 and CD86 (also known as B7) that binds to CD28 on T helper cells to supply the co-stimulatory signal. These interactions allow T helper cells to achieve full effector function and provide T helper cells with continued survival and differentiation signals preventing them from undergoing apoptosis due to lack of TCR signaling. For example, IL-2 signaling in T cells upregulates the expression of anti-apoptotic protein Bcl-2, but T cell production of IL-2 and the high-affinity IL-2 receptor IL-2RA both require continued signal from TCR recognition of MHC-bound antigen.

==== Activation ====
Macrophages can achieve different activation phenotypes through interactions with different subsets of T helper cells, such as T_{H}1 and T_{H}2. Although there is a broad spectrum of macrophage activation phenotypes, there are two major phenotypes that are commonly acknowledged. They are the classically activated macrophages, or M1 macrophages, and the alternatively activated macrophages, or M2 macrophages. M1 macrophages are proinflammatory, while M2 macrophages are mostly anti-inflammatory.

===== Classical =====
T_{H}1 cells play an important role in classical macrophage activation as part of type 1 immune response against intracellular pathogens (such as intracellular bacteria) that can survive and replicate inside host cells, especially those pathogens that replicate even after being phagocytosed by macrophages. After the TCR of T_{H}1 cells recognize specific antigen peptide-bound MHC class II molecules on macrophages, T_{H}1 cells 1) secrete IFN-γ and 2) upregulate the expression of CD40 ligand (CD40L), which binds to CD40 on macrophages. These 2 signals activate the macrophages and enhance their ability to kill intracellular pathogens through increased production of antimicrobial molecules such as nitric oxide (NO) and superoxide (O^{2-}). This enhancement of macrophages' antimicrobial ability by T_{H}1 cells is known as classical macrophage activation, and the activated macrophages are known as classically activated macrophages, or M1 macrophages. The M1 macrophages in turn upregulate B7 molecules and antigen presentation through MHC class II molecules to provide signals that sustain T cell help. The activation of T_{H}1 and M1 macrophage is a positive feedback loop, with IFN-γ from T_{H}1 cells upregulating CD40 expression on macrophages; the interaction between CD40 on the macrophages and CD40L on T cells activate macrophages to secrete IL-12; and IL-12 promotes more IFN-γ secretion from T_{H}1 cells. The initial contact between macrophage antigen-bound MHC II and TCR serves as the contact point between the two cells where most of the IFN-γ secretion and CD-40L on T cells concentrate to, so only macrophages directly interacting with T_{H}1 cells are likely to be activated.

In addition to activating M1 macrophages, T_{H}1 cells express Fas ligand (FasL) and lymphotoxin beta (LT-β) to help kill chronically infected macrophages that can no longer kill pathogens. The killing of chronically infected macrophages release pathogens to the extracellular space that can then be killed by other activated macrophages. T_{H}1 cells also help recruit more monocytes, the precursor to macrophages, to the infection site. T_{H}1 secretion TNF-α and LT-α to make blood vessels easier for monocytes to bind to and exit. T_{H}1 secretion of CCL2 as a chemoattractant for monocytes. IL-3 and GM-CSF released by T_{H}1 cells stimulate more monocyte production in the bone marrow.

When intracellular pathogens cannot be eliminated, such as in the case of Mycobacterium tuberculosis, the pathogen is contained through the formation of granuloma, an aggregation of infected macrophages surrounded by activated T cells. The macrophages bordering the activated lymphocytes often fuse to form multinucleated giant cells that appear to have increased antimicrobial ability due to their proximity to T_{H}1 cells, but over time, the cells in the center start to die and form necrotic tissue.

===== Alternative =====
T_{H}2 cells play an important role in alternative macrophage activation as part of type 2 immune response against large extracellular pathogens like helminths. T_{H}2 cells secrete IL-4 and IL-13, which activate macrophages to become M2 macrophages, also known as alternatively activated macrophages. M2 macrophages express arginase-1, an enzyme that converts arginine to ornithine and urea. Ornithine help increase smooth muscle contraction to expel the worm and also participates in tissue and wound repair. Ornithine can be further metabolized to proline, which is essential for synthesizing collagen. M2 macrophages can also decrease inflammation by producing IL-1 receptor antagonist (IL-1RA) and IL-1 receptors that do not lead to downstream inflammatory signaling (IL-1RII).

==== Interactions with CD8^{+} cytotoxic t cells ====
Another part of the adaptive immunity activation involves stimulating CD8^{+} via cross presentation of antigens peptides on MHC class I molecules. Studies have shown that proinflammatory macrophages are capable of cross presentation of antigens on MHC class I molecules, but whether macrophage cross-presentation plays a role in naïve or memory CD8^{+} T cell activation is still unclear.

==== Interactions with B cells ====
Macrophages have been shown to secrete cytokines BAFF and APRIL, which are important for plasma cell isotype switching. APRIL and IL-6 secreted by macrophage precursors in the bone marrow help maintain survival of plasma cells homed to the bone marrow.

==== Subtypes ====
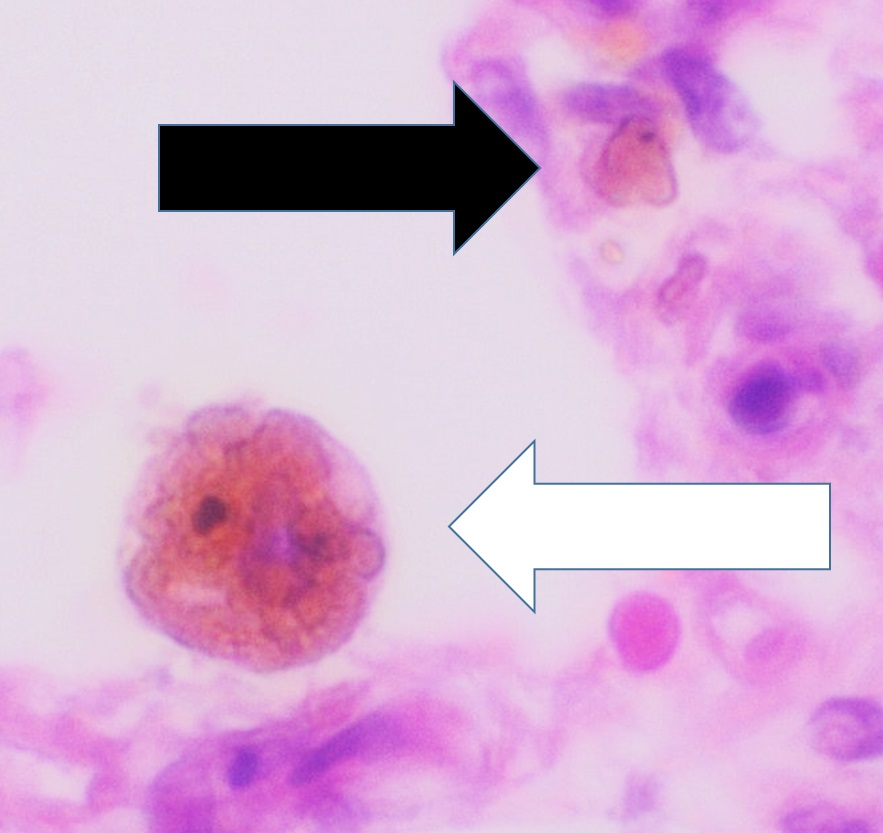
Siderophage

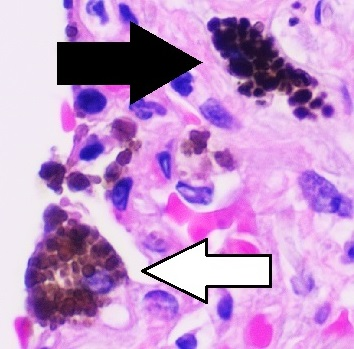
Anthracotic macrophage

Pigmented macrophages can be classified by the pigment type, such as for alveolar macrophages shown above (white arrows). A "siderophage" contains hemosiderin (also shown by black arrow in left image), while anthracotic macrophages result from coal dust inhalation (and also long-term air pollution). H&E stain.

There are several activated forms of macrophages. In spite of a spectrum of ways to activate macrophages, there are two main groups designated M1 and M2. M1 macrophages: as mentioned earlier (previously referred to as classically activated macrophages), M1 "killer" macrophages are activated by LPS and IFN-gamma, and secrete high levels of IL-12 and low levels of IL-10. M1 macrophages have pro-inflammatory, bactericidal, and phagocytic functions. In contrast, the M2 "repair" designation (also referred to as alternatively activated macrophages) broadly refers to macrophages that function in constructive processes like wound healing and tissue repair, and those that turn off damaging immune system activation by producing anti-inflammatory cytokines like IL-10. M2 is the phenotype of resident tissue macrophages, and can be further elevated by IL-4. M2 macrophages produce high levels of IL-10, TGF-beta and low levels of IL-12. Tumor-associated macrophages are mainly of the M2 phenotype, and seem to actively promote tumor growth.

Macrophages exist in a variety of phenotypes which are determined by the role they play in wound maturation. Phenotypes can be predominantly separated into two major categories; M1 and M2. M1 macrophages are the dominating phenotype observed in the early stages of inflammation and are activated by four key mediators: interferon-γ (IFN-γ), tumor necrosis factor (TNF), and damage associated molecular patterns (DAMPs). These mediator molecules create a pro-inflammatory response that in return produce pro-inflammatory cytokines like Interleukin-6 and TNF. Unlike M1 macrophages, M2 macrophages secrete an anti-inflammatory response via the addition of Interleukin-4 or Interleukin-13. They also play a role in wound healing and are needed for revascularization and reepithelialization. M2 macrophages are divided into four major types based on their roles: M2a, M2b, M2c, and M2d. How M2 phenotypes are determined is still up for discussion but studies have shown that their environment allows them to adjust to whichever phenotype is most appropriate to efficiently heal the wound.

M2 macrophages are needed for vascular stability. They produce vascular endothelial growth factor-A and TGF-β1. There is a phenotype shift from M1 to M2 macrophages in acute wounds, however this shift is impaired for chronic wounds. This dysregulation results in insufficient M2 macrophages and its corresponding growth factors that aid in wound repair. With a lack of these growth factors/anti-inflammatory cytokines and an overabundance of pro-inflammatory cytokines from M1 macrophages chronic wounds are unable to heal in a timely manner. Normally, after neutrophils eat debris/pathogens they perform apoptosis and are removed. At this point, inflammation is not needed and M1 undergoes a switch to M2 (anti-inflammatory). However, dysregulation occurs as the M1 macrophages are unable/do not phagocytose neutrophils that have undergone apoptosis leading to increased macrophage migration and inflammation.

Both M1 and M2 macrophages play a role in promotion of atherosclerosis. M1 macrophages promote atherosclerosis by inflammation. M2 macrophages can remove cholesterol from blood vessels, but when the cholesterol is oxidized, the M2 macrophages become apoptotic foam cells contributing to the atheromatous plaque of atherosclerosis.

=== Role in muscle regeneration ===
The first step to understanding the importance of macrophages in muscle repair, growth, and regeneration is that there are two "waves" of macrophages with the onset of damageable muscle use– subpopulations that do and do not directly have an influence on repairing muscle. The initial wave is a phagocytic population that comes along during periods of increased muscle use that are sufficient to cause muscle membrane lysis and membrane inflammation, which can enter and degrade the contents of injured muscle fibers. These early-invading, phagocytic macrophages reach their highest concentration about 24 hours following the onset of some form of muscle cell injury or reloading. Their concentration rapidly declines after 48 hours. The second group is the non-phagocytic types that are distributed near regenerative fibers. These peak between two and four days and remain elevated for several days while muscle tissue is rebuilding. The first subpopulation has no direct benefit to repairing muscle, while the second non-phagocytic group does.

It is thought that macrophages release soluble substances that influence the proliferation, differentiation, growth, repair, and regeneration of muscle, but at this time the factor that is produced to mediate these effects is unknown. It is known that macrophages' involvement in promoting tissue repair is not muscle specific; they accumulate in numerous tissues during the healing process phase following injury.

=== Role in wound healing ===
Macrophages are essential for wound healing. They replace polymorphonuclear neutrophils as the predominant cells in the wound by day two after injury. Attracted to the wound site by growth factors released by platelets and other cells, monocytes from the bloodstream enter the area through blood vessel walls. Numbers of monocytes in the wound peak one to one and a half days after the injury occurs. Once they are in the wound site, monocytes mature into macrophages. The spleen contains half the body's monocytes in reserve ready to be deployed to injured tissue.

The macrophage's main role is to phagocytize bacteria and damaged tissue, and they also debride damaged tissue by releasing proteases. Macrophages also secrete a number of factors such as growth factors and other cytokines, especially during the third and fourth post-wound days. These factors attract cells involved in the proliferation stage of healing to the area. Macrophages may also restrain the contraction phase. Macrophages are stimulated by the low oxygen content of their surroundings to produce factors that induce and speed angiogenesis and they also stimulate cells that re-epithelialize the wound, create granulation tissue, and lay down a new extracellular matrix. By secreting these factors, macrophages contribute to pushing the wound healing process into the next phase.

=== Role in limb regeneration ===
Scientists have elucidated that as well as eating up material debris, macrophages are involved in the typical limb regeneration in the salamander. They found that removing the macrophages from a salamander resulted in failure of limb regeneration and a scarring response.

=== Role in iron homeostasis ===
As described above, macrophages play a key role in removing dying or dead cells and cellular debris. Erythrocytes have a lifespan on average of 120 days and so are constantly being destroyed by macrophages in the spleen and liver. Macrophages will also engulf macromolecules, and so play a key role in the pharmacokinetics of parenteral irons.

The iron that is released from the haemoglobin is either stored internally in ferritin or is released into the circulation via ferroportin. In cases where systemic iron levels are raised, or where inflammation is present, raised levels of hepcidin act on macrophage ferroportin channels, leading to iron remaining within the macrophages.

=== Role in pigment retainment ===
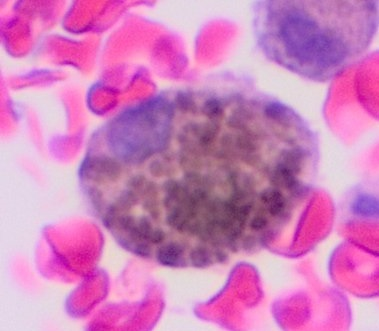
Melanophage. H&E stain.

Melanophages are a subset of tissue-resident macrophages able to absorb pigment, either native to the organism or exogenous (such as tattoos), from extracellular space. In contrast to dendritic juncional melanocytes, which synthesize melanosomes and contain various stages of their development, the melanophages only accumulate phagocytosed melanin in lysosome-like phagosomes. This occurs repeatedly as the pigment from dead dermal macrophages is phagocytosed by their successors, preserving the tattoo in the same place.

=== Role in tissue homeostasis ===
Every tissue harbors its own specialized population of resident macrophages, which entertain reciprocal interconnections with the stroma and functional tissue. These resident macrophages are sessile (non-migratory), provide essential growth factors to support the physiological function of the tissue (e.g. macrophage-neuronal crosstalk in the guts), and can actively protect the tissue from inflammatory damage.

=== Nerve-associated macrophages ===
Nerve-associated macrophages or NAMs are those tissue-resident macrophages that are associated with nerves. Some of them are known to have an elongated morphology of up to 200μm

== Clinical significance ==
Due to their role in phagocytosis, macrophages are involved in many diseases of the immune system. For example, they participate in the formation of granulomas, inflammatory lesions that may be caused by a large number of diseases. Some disorders, mostly rare, of ineffective phagocytosis and macrophage function have been described, for example.

=== As a host for intracellular pathogens ===
In their role as a phagocytic immune cell macrophages are responsible for engulfing pathogens to destroy them. Some pathogens subvert this process and instead live inside the macrophage. This provides an environment in which the pathogen is hidden from the immune system and allows it to replicate.

Diseases with this type of behaviour include tuberculosis (caused by Mycobacterium tuberculosis) and leishmaniasis (caused by Leishmania species).

In order to minimize the possibility of becoming the host of an intracellular bacteria, macrophages have evolved defense mechanisms such as induction of nitric oxide and reactive oxygen intermediates, which are toxic to microbes. Macrophages have also evolved the ability to restrict the microbe's nutrient supply and induce autophagy.

==== Tuberculosis ====
Once engulfed by a macrophage, the causative agent of tuberculosis, Mycobacterium tuberculosis, avoids cellular defenses and uses the cell to replicate. Recent evidence suggests that in response to the pulmonary infection of Mycobacterium tuberculosis, the peripheral macrophages matures into M1 phenotype. Macrophage M1 phenotype is characterized by increased secretion of pro-inflammatory cytokines (IL-1β, TNF-α, and IL-6) and increased glycolytic activities essential for clearance of infection.

==== Leishmaniasis ====
Upon phagocytosis by a macrophage, the Leishmania parasite finds itself in a phagocytic vacuole. Under normal circumstances, this phagocytic vacuole would develop into a lysosome and its contents would be digested. Leishmania alter this process and avoid being destroyed; instead, they make a home inside the vacuole.

==== Chikungunya ====
Infection of macrophages in joints is associated with local inflammation during and after the acute phase of Chikungunya (caused by CHIKV or Chikungunya virus).

==== Others ====
Adenovirus (most common cause of pink eye) can remain latent in a host macrophage, with continued viral shedding 6–18 months after initial infection.

Brucella spp. can remain latent in a macrophage via inhibition of phagosome–lysosome fusion; causes brucellosis (undulant fever).

Legionella pneumophila, the causative agent of Legionnaires' disease, also establishes residence within macrophages.

=== Heart disease ===
Macrophages are the predominant cells involved in creating the progressive plaque lesions of atherosclerosis.

Focal recruitment of macrophages occurs after the onset of acute myocardial infarction. These macrophages function to remove debris, apoptotic cells and to prepare for tissue regeneration.

=== HIV infection ===
Macrophages also play a role in human immunodeficiency virus (HIV) infection. Like T cells, macrophages can be infected with HIV, and even become a reservoir of ongoing virus replication throughout the body. HIV can enter the macrophage through binding of gp120 to CD4 and second membrane receptor, CCR5 (a chemokine receptor). Both circulating monocytes and macrophages serve as a reservoir for the virus. Macrophages are better able to resist infection by HIV-1 than CD4+ T cells, although susceptibility to HIV infection differs among macrophage subtypes.

=== Cancer ===
Macrophages can contribute to tumor growth and progression by promoting tumor cell proliferation and invasion, fostering tumor angiogenesis and suppressing antitumor immune cells. Inflammatory compounds, such as tumor necrosis factor (TNF)-alpha released by the macrophages activate the gene switch nuclear factor-kappa B. NF-κB then enters the nucleus of a tumor cell and turns on production of proteins that stop apoptosis and promote cell proliferation and inflammation. Moreover, macrophages serve as a source for many pro-angiogenic factors including vascular endothelial factor (VEGF), tumor necrosis factor-alpha (TNF-alpha), macrophage colony-stimulating factor (M-CSF/CSF1) and IL-1 and IL-6, contributing further to the tumor growth.

Macrophages have been shown to infiltrate a number of tumors. Their number correlates with poor prognosis in certain cancers, including cancers of breast, cervix, bladder, brain and prostate. Some tumors can also produce factors, including M-CSF/CSF1, MCP-1/CCL2 and Angiotensin II, that trigger the amplification and mobilization of macrophages in tumors. Additionally, subcapsular sinus macrophages in tumor-draining lymph nodes can suppress cancer progression by containing the spread of tumor-derived materials.

=== Cancer therapy ===
Experimental studies indicate that macrophages can affect all therapeutic modalities, including surgery, chemotherapy, radiotherapy, immunotherapy and targeted therapy. Macrophages can influence treatment outcomes both positively and negatively. Macrophages can be protective in different ways: they can remove dead tumor cells (in a process called phagocytosis) following treatments that kill these cells; they can serve as drug depots for some anticancer drugs; they can also be activated by some therapies to promote antitumor immunity. Macrophages can also be deleterious in several ways: for example they can suppress various chemotherapies, radiotherapies and immunotherapies. Because macrophages can regulate tumor progression, therapeutic strategies to reduce the number of these cells, or to manipulate their phenotypes, are currently being tested in cancer patients. However, macrophages are also involved in antibody mediated cytotoxicity (ADCC) and this mechanism has been proposed to be important for certain cancer immunotherapy antibodies. Similarly, studies identified macrophages genetically engineered to express chimeric antigen receptors as promising therapeutic approach to lowering tumor burden.

=== Obesity ===
It has been observed that increased number of pro-inflammatory macrophages within obese adipose tissue contributes to obesity complications including insulin resistance and diabetes type 2.

The modulation of the inflammatory state of adipose tissue macrophages has therefore been considered a possible therapeutic target to treat obesity-related diseases. Although adipose tissue macrophages are subject to anti-inflammatory homeostatic control by sympathetic innervation, experiments using ADRB2 gene knockout mice indicate that this effect is indirectly exerted through the modulation of adipocyte function, and not through direct Beta-2 adrenergic receptor activation, suggesting that adrenergic stimulation of macrophages may be insufficient to impact adipose tissue inflammation or function in obesity.

== Intestinal macrophages ==
Though very similar in structure to tissue macrophages, intestinal macrophages have evolved specific characteristics and functions given their natural environment, which is in the digestive tract. Macrophages and intestinal macrophages have high plasticity causing their phenotype to be altered by their environments. Like macrophages, intestinal macrophages are differentiated monocytes, though intestinal macrophages have to coexist with the microbiome in the intestines. This is a challenge considering the bacteria found in the gut are not recognized as "self" and could be potential targets for phagocytosis by the macrophage.

To prevent the destruction of the gut bacteria, intestinal macrophages have developed key differences compared to other macrophages. Primarily, intestinal macrophages do not induce inflammatory responses. Whereas tissue macrophages release various inflammatory cytokines, such as IL-1, IL-6 and TNF-α, intestinal macrophages do not produce or secrete inflammatory cytokines. This change is directly caused by the intestinal macrophages environment. Surrounding intestinal epithelial cells release TGF-β, which induces the change from proinflammatory macrophage to noninflammatory macrophage.

Even though the inflammatory response is downregulated in intestinal macrophages, phagocytosis is still carried out. There is no drop off in phagocytosis efficiency as intestinal macrophages are able to effectively phagocytize the bacteria,S. typhimurium and E. coli, but intestinal macrophages still do not release cytokines, even after phagocytosis. Also, intestinal macrophages do not express lipopolysaccharide (LPS), IgA, or IgG receptors. The lack of LPS receptors is important for the gut as the intestinal macrophages do not detect the microbe-associated molecular patterns (MAMPS/PAMPS) of the intestinal microbiome. Nor do they express IL-2 and IL-3 growth factor receptors.

=== Role in disease ===
Intestinal macrophages have been shown to play a role in inflammatory bowel disease (IBD), such as Crohn's disease (CD) and ulcerative colitis (UC). In a healthy gut, intestinal macrophages limit the inflammatory response in the gut, but in a disease-state, intestinal macrophage numbers and diversity are altered. This leads to inflammation of the gut and disease symptoms of IBD. Intestinal macrophages are critical in maintaining gut homeostasis. The presence of inflammation or pathogen alters this homeostasis, and concurrently alters the intestinal macrophages. There has yet to be a determined mechanism for the alteration of the intestinal macrophages by recruitment of new monocytes or changes in the already present intestinal macrophages.

Additionally, a new study reveals macrophages limit iron access to bacteria by releasing extracellular vesicles, improving sepsis outcomes.

== Media ==
An active J774 macrophage is seen taking up four conidia in a co-operative manner. The J774 cells were treated with 5ng/ml interferon-γ one night before filming with conidia. Observations were made every 30s over a 2.5hr period.

Two highly active alveolar macrophages can be seen ingesting conidia. Time lapse is 30s per frame over 2.5hr.

== History ==
Macrophages were first discovered late in the 19th century by zoologist Élie Metchnikoff. Metchnikoff revolutionized the branch of macrophages by combining philosophical insights and the evolutionary study of life. Later on, Van Furth during the 1960s proposed the idea that circulating blood monocytes in adults allowed for the origin of all tissue macrophages. In recent years, publishing regarding macrophages has led people to believe that multiple resident tissue macrophages are independent of the blood monocytes as it is formed during the embryonic stage of development. Within the 21st century, all the ideas concerning the origin of macrophages (present in tissues) were compiled together to suggest that physiologically complex organisms, from macrophages independently by mechanisms that don't have to depend on the blood monocytes.

== See also ==
- Bacteriophage
- Dendritic cell
- Histiocyte
- List of distinct cell types in the adult human body
