= DHRS9 =

Protein-coding gene in the species Homo sapiens

Identifiers
- Aliases: DHRS9, 3-alpha-HSD, 3ALPHA-HSD, RDH-E2, RDH-TBE, RDH15, RDHL, RDHTBE, RETSDR8, SDR9C4, dehydrogenase/reductase (SDR family) member 9, dehydrogenase/reductase 9
- External IDs: OMIM: 612131; MGI: 2442798; GeneCards: DHRS9
Enzyme activity
| EC # | BRENDA | ExPASy | KEGG | MetaCyc |
|---|---|---|---|---|
| 1.1.1.53 | ↗ | ↗ | ↗ | ↗ |
| 1.1.1.105 | ↗ | ↗ | ↗ | ↗ |
| 1.1.1.209 | ↗ | ↗ | ↗ | ↗ |

Gene location (Human)
| Chr. | Chromosome 2 (human) |
| Band | 2q31.1 | Start | 169,064,789 bp |
| Band | 2q31.1 | End | 169,096,167 bp |

Gene location (Mouse)
| Chr. | Chromosome 2 (mouse) |
| Band | 2|2 C2 | Start | 69,210,789 bp |
| Band | 2|2 C2 | End | 69,234,877 bp |
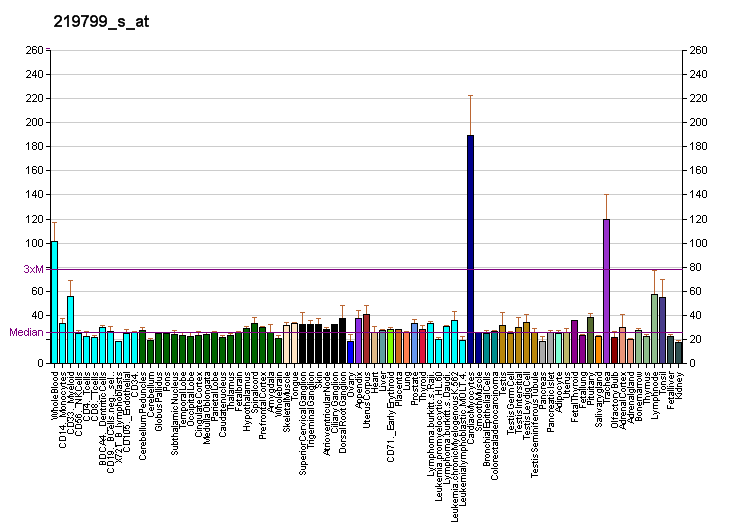
RNA expression pattern
| Bgee | Human / Mouse (ortholog); Top expressed in: nasal epithelium; epithelium of nasopharynx; epithelium of bronchus; bronchial epithelial cell; mucosa of transverse colon; palpebral conjunctiva; mucosa of sigmoid colon; mucosa of ileum; olfactory zone of nasal mucosa; sperm / Top expressed in: granulocyte; esophagus; placenta; lip; yolk sac; ileum; jejunum; zone of skin; ovary; stomach; More reference expression data |
| BioGPS | More reference expression data |
Gene ontology
| Molecular function | oxidoreductase activity; testosterone dehydrogenase (NAD+) activity; alcohol dehydrogenase (NAD+) activity; racemase and epimerase activity; NAD-retinol dehydrogenase activity; androsterone dehydrogenase activity; androstan-3-alpha,17-beta-diol dehydrogenase activity |
| Cellular component | intracellular membrane-bounded organelle; organelle membrane; integral component of endoplasmic reticulum membrane; endoplasmic reticulum membrane; endoplasmic reticulum; membrane |
| Biological process | retinoic acid biosynthetic process; retinol metabolic process; 9-cis-retinoic acid biosynthetic process; epithelial cell differentiation; androgen metabolic process; progesterone metabolic process; lipid metabolism; steroid metabolic process |
Sources:Amigo / QuickGO
Orthologs
| Databases | NCBI: entry; OMA: entry |
| Species | Human | Mouse |
| Entrez | 10170 | 241452 |
| Ensembl | ENSG00000073737 | ENSMUSG00000027068 |
| UniProt | Q9BPW9 | Q58NB6 |
| RefSeq (mRNA) | NM_001142270; NM_001142271; NM_001289763; NM_005771; NM_199204 NM_001376924 | NM_175512 |
| RefSeq (protein) | NP_001135742; NP_001135743; NP_001276692; NP_954674; NP_001363853 | NP_780721 |
| Location (UCSC) | Chr 2: 169.06 – 169.1 Mb | Chr 2: 69.21 – 69.23 Mb |
| PubMed search |
- Wikidata
| View/Edit Human | View/Edit Mouse |

Dehydrogenase/reductase SDR family member 9 is an enzyme that in humans is encoded by the DHRS9 gene.
