= Macrophage polarization =

Biological process

Macrophage polarization is a process by which macrophages adopt different functional programs in response to the signals from their microenvironment. This ability is connected to their multiple roles in the organism: they are powerful effector cells of the innate immune system, but also important in removal of cellular debris, embryonic development and tissue repair.

By simplified classification, macrophage phenotype has been divided into 2 groups: M1 (classically activated macrophages) and M2 (alternatively activated macrophages). This broad classification was based on in vitro studies, in which cultured macrophages were treated with molecules that stimulated their phenotype switching to a particular state. In addition to chemical stimulation, it has been shown that the stiffness of the underlying substrate a macrophage is grown on can direct polarization state, functional roles and migration mode. A continuum of M1-M2 polarization may arise even in the absence of polarizing cytokines and differences in substrate stiffness. M1 macrophages were described as the pro-inflammatory type, important in direct host-defense against pathogens, such as phagocytosis and secretion of pro-inflammatory cytokines and microbicidal molecules. M2 macrophages were described to have quite the opposite function: regulation of the resolution phase of inflammation and the repair of damaged tissues. Later, more extensive in vitro and ex vivo studies have shown that macrophage phenotypes are much more diverse, overlapping with each other in terms of gene expression and function, revealing that these many hybrid states form a continuum of activation states which depend on the microenvironment. Moreover, in vivo, there is a high diversity in gene expression profile between different populations of tissue macrophages. Macrophage activation spectrum is thus considered to be wider, involving complex regulatory pathway to response to plethora of different signals from the environment. The diversity of macrophage phenotypes still remain to be fully characterized in vivo.

The imbalance of the macrophage types is related to a number of immunity-related diseases. For example, it has been shown that increased M1/M2 ratio correlates with development of inflammatory bowel disease, as well as obesity in mice. On the other side, in vitro experiments implicated M2 macrophages as the primary mediators of tissue fibrosis. Several studies have associated the fibrotic profile of M2 macrophages with the pathogenesis of systemic sclerosis.

== Types ==
=== M1 ===
Classically activated macrophages (M1) were named by George Mackaness in the 1960s. M1-activation in vitro is evoked by treatment with TLR ligands such as bacterial lipopolysaccharide (LPS) - typical for Gram-negative bacteria and lipoteichoic acid (LTA) - typical for Gram-positive bacteria, granulocyte-macrophage colony-stimulating factor (GM-CSF) or combination of LPS and interferon-gamma (IFN-γ). Similarly in vivo, classically activated macrophages arise in response to IFN-γ produced by Th1 lymphocytes or by natural killer cells (NK), and tumor-necrosis factor (TNF), produced by antigen-presenting cells (APCs).

M1-activated macrophages express transcription factors such as interferon regulatory factor (IRF5), nuclear factor of kappa light polypeptide gene enhancer (NF-κB), activator protein (AP-1) and STAT1. This leads to enhanced microbicidal capacity and secretion of high levels of pro-inflammatory cytokines: e.g. IFN-γ, IL-1, IL-6, IL-12, IL-23 and TNFα. Moreover, to increase their pathogen-killing ability, they produce increased amounts of chemicals called reactive oxygen species (ROS) and nitrogen radicals (caused by upregulation of inducible NO synthase iNOS). Thanks to their ability to fight pathogens, M1 macrophages are present during acute infectious diseases. A number of studies have shown that bacterial infection induces polarization of macrophages toward the M1 phenotype, resulting in phagocytosis and intracellular killing of bacteria in vitro and in vivo. For instance, Listeria monocytogenes, a Gram-positive bacteria causing listeriosis is shown to induce an M1 polarization, as well as Salmonella Typhi (the agent of typhoid fever) and Salmonella Typhimurium (causing gastroenteritis), which are shown to induce the M1 polarization of human and murine macrophages. Macrophages are polarized toward the M1 profile during the early phase of Mycobacterium tuberculosis infection, as well as other mycobacterial species such as Mycobacterium ulcerans (causing Buruli ulcer disease) and Mycobacterium avium.

Improper and untimely control of M1 macrophage-mediated inflammatory response can lead to disruption of normal tissue homeostasis and impede vascular repair. An uncontrolled production of pro-inflammatory cytokines during the inflammation can lead to the formation of cytokine storm, thereby contributing to the pathogenesis of severe sepsis. In order to counteract the inflammatory response, macrophages undergo apoptosis or polarize to an M2 phenotype to protect the host from the excessive injury.

=== M2 ===
Alternatively activated macrophages (M2) were discovered in early 1990s and named according to previously-discovered Th2 cell-mediated anti-inflammatory response. M2 macrophages resolve inflammation, help tissue healing, tolerate self-antigens and certain neoantigens (for example apoptotic cells, symbiont cells, gametes and cells of the embryo in the uterus). M2 macrophages hence govern functions at the interfaces of immunity, tissue development and turnover, metabolism, and endocrine signaling. It is shown in vitro that macrophage treatment with IL-4 and IL-13 leads to inhibition of pro-inflammatory signals production and upregulation of scavenging mannose receptor CD206. Further studies have shown that M2 polarization may be induced through different activation signals leading in fact to different M2 phenotypes having different roles. It has first been suggested that M2 macrophages can be divided in two groups: regulatory and wound-healing macrophages. Regulatory macrophages were described to have anti-inflammatory properties, which are important in resolutive phases of the inflammation, producing the immunosuppressive cytokine IL-10. Differentiation toward the regulatory macrophage phenotype may be triggered by immune complexes, prostaglandins, apoptotic cells and IL-10. On the other side, wound healing macrophages were shown to produce IL-4 and upregulate arginase activity, which is the enzyme enrolled in production of polyamines and collagen, thus regenerating the damaged tissue.

Further investigation of M2 subtypes led to even more complex systematization, where the authors describe M2a, M2b, and M2c subtype. M2a macrophages are activated by IL-4 and IL-13 which evokes upregulated expression of arginase-1, mannose receptor MRc1 (CD206), antigen presentation by MHC II system, and production of IL-10 and TGF-𝛽, leading to tissue regeneration and internalization of pro-inflammatory molecules to prevent the inflammatory response. The M2b macrophages produce IL-1, IL-6, IL-10, TNF-𝛼 as a response to immune complexes or LPS, leading to activation of Th2 cells and anti-inflammatory activity. M2c macrophages are activated by IL-10, transforming growth factor beta (TGF-𝛽) and glucocorticoids, and produce IL-10 and TGFβ, leading to suppression of inflammatory response. Some authors mention the M2d subtype activation as a response to IL-6 and adenosines, and these macrophages are also referred as tumor-associated macrophages (TAM).

Although M2 activation state involves heterogeneous macrophage populations, some markers are shared between subtypes, thus the strict macrophage division into subtypes is not possible so far. In mice, CD206 or the mannose receptor marker can be used to differentiate the M2 from M1. Moreover, the in vivo translation of these M2 subdivisions is difficult. Tissues contain complex range of stimuli leading to mixed macrophage populations with a wide spectrum of activation states.

== Continuum of polarization states ==
A lot remains to be learned about macrophage polarized activation states and their role in immune response. Since there is not a rigid barrier between described macrophage phenotypes and that known markers are expressed by more than one of these activation states, it is impossible so far to classify macrophage subtypes in proper and precise way. Thus their differences are rather considered as a continuum of functional states without clear boundaries. Moreover, it is observed that macrophage states are changing during the time course of the inflammation and disease. This plasticity of macrophage phenotype has added to the confusion regarding the existence of individual macrophage sub-types in vivo.

== Tumour associated macrophages ==
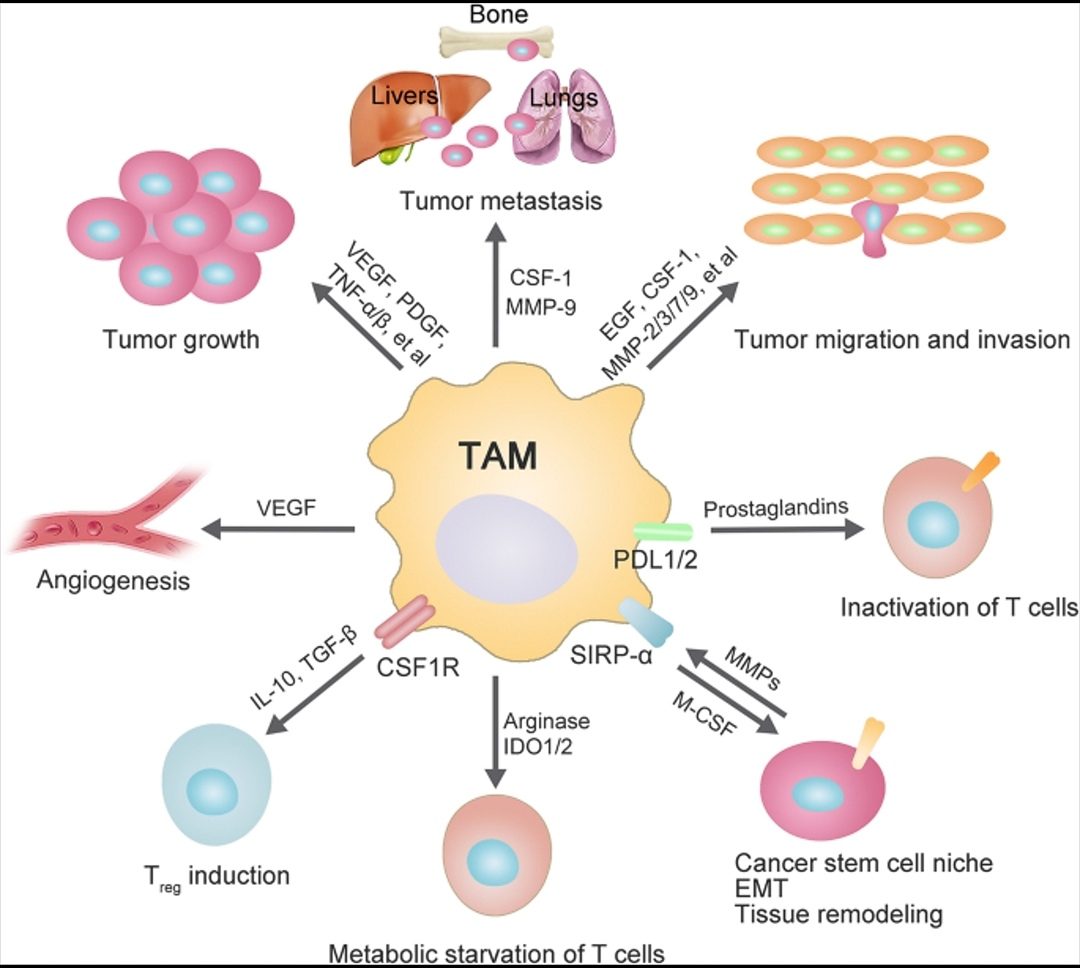
Function of TAM.

Tumour-associated macrophages (TAM) are typical for their protumoural functions like promotion of cancer cell motility, metastasis formation and angiogenesis and their formation is dependent on microenvironmetal factors which are present in developing tumour. TAMs produce immunosuppressive cytokines like IL-10, TGFβ and PGE2 very small amount of NO or ROS and low levels of inflammatory cytokines (IL-12, IL-1β, TNFα, IL-6). Ability of TAMs to present tumour-associated antigens is decreased as well as stimulation of the anti-tumour functions of T and NK cells. Also TAMs are not able to lyse tumour cells. Targeting of TAM may be a novel therapeutic strategy against cancer, as has been demonstrated through the delivery of agents to either alter the recruitment and distribution of TAMs, deplete existing TAMs, or induce the re-education of TAMs from an M2 to an M1 phenotype.

== Tissue resident macrophages ==
Some macrophages are known to be residing in the tissues and help in maintaining the tissue microenvironment. These came to be known as tissue resident macrophages(TRMs). The TRMs in the pancreatic islets are known to be inflammatory in nature and fall under the M1 category.
