= Index of immunology articles =

Immunology is the study of the immune system during health and disease. Below is a list of immunology-related articles.

== A ==
- Activation-induced (cytidine) deaminase
- Active hexose correlated compound
- Active immunotherapy
- Acute-phase protein
- Adaptive immune system
- Adipose tissue macrophages
- Adoptive immunity
- Affinity maturation
- Allele frequency net database
- Allergen
- Allergen immunotherapy
- Allergy
- Alloantigen recognition
- Alloimmunity
- Allorecognition
- Allostasis
- Allostatic load
- Allotransplantation
- Anti-cholesterol
- Anti-gliadin antibodies
- Antibody
- Antibody opsonization
- Antibody-dependent cell-mediated cytotoxicity
- Antibody-dependent enhancement
- Antigen
- Antigen presentation
- Antigen processing
- Antigenic variation
- Antigenicity
- Antimicrobial peptides
- Antitoxin
- Apoptosis
- Artemis complex
- Artificial immune system
- Artificial induction of immunity
- Autoantibody
- Autoimmune regulator
- Autoimmunity
- Autologous immune enhancement therapy
- Autophagy

== B ==
- Beta-2 microglobulin
- Binding antibody
- Biological response modifiers
- Blocking antibody
- Blotto (biology)
- BNAber
- Body odor
- Bone marrow-derived macrophage
- Breakthrough infection
- Broadly neutralizing HIV-1 antibodies
- Bursa of Fabricius

== C ==
- C-C chemokine receptor type 6
- C-C chemokine receptor type 7
- Calreticulin
- Cancer immunology
- Cancer immunoprevention
- Cancer immunotherapy
- Cantuzumab ravtansine
- Cathelicidin
- CC chemokine receptors
- CCBP2
- CCL1
- CCL11
- CCL12
- CCL13
- CCL14
- CCL15
- CCL16
- CCL17
- CCL18
- CCL19
- CCL2
- CCL20
- CCL21
- CCL22
- CCL23
- CCL24
- CCL25
- CCL26
- CCL27
- CCL28
- CCL3
- CCL5
- CCL6
- CCL7
- CCL8
- CCL9
- CCR1
- CCR10
- CCR2
- CCR3 (gene)
- CCR4
- CCR5
- CCR8 (gene)
- CCR9
- CCRL1
- CCRL2
- CD117
- CD32B
- CD4
- CD4+ T cells and antitumor immunity
- CD74
- CD94/NKG2
- Cell-mediated immunity
- CELSR1
- Central tolerance
- Chemokine
- Chemokine receptor
- Chimeric antigen receptor
- Cholinergic anti-inflammatory pathway
- CLIP (protein)
- Clonal anergy
- Clonal deletion
- Clonal selection
- Clone (cell biology)
- CMKLR1
- Colony stimulating factor 1 receptor
- Colony-stimulating factor
- Common gamma chain
- Complementarity-determining region
- Computational immunology
- Contact immunity
- CpG Oligodeoxynucleotide
- CR6261
- CroFab
- Cross-presentation
- Cross-reactivity
- Cryptic self epitopes
- Cryptotope
- CX3CL1
- CX3CR1
- CXC chemokine receptors
- CXCL1
- CXCL10
- CXCL11
- CXCL13
- CXCL14
- CXCL15
- CXCL16
- CXCL17
- CXCL2
- CXCL3
- CXCL5
- CXCL6
- CXCL7
- CXCL9
- CXCR4
- CXCR6
- CXCR7
- Cytokine
- Cytokine redundancy
- Cytokine storm
- Cytotoxicity

== D ==
- DAMPs
- Danger model
- Defensin
- Degranulation
- Dendritic cell
- Dextran 1
- Dispanin
- Dog leukocyte antigen
- Drug resistance
- Duffy antigen system

== E ==
- Ecoimmunology
- Ectodysplasin A2 receptor
- Empyema
- Enzyme potentiated desensitization
- Epithelial reticular cell
- Epitope
- Erythropoietin
- Erythropoietin receptor
- Essential fatty acid interactions
- Eutherian fetoembryonic defense system (eu-FEDS) hypothesis
- Experiments in immunology

== F ==
- Fas ligand
- Fas receptor
- Fc receptor
- Fc receptor-like molecule
- FcεRI
- Fibroblast-like synoviocyte
- FITkit
- FluoroSpot
- Forssman antigen
- Fragment antigen-binding
- Fragment crystallizable region
- Freund's adjuvant

== G ==
- Gc-MAF
- Gluten immunochemistry
- Glycoprotein 130
- Graft versus tumor effect
- Granulocyte colony-stimulating factor
- Granulocyte colony-stimulating factor receptor
- Granulocyte macrophage colony-stimulating factor
- Granulocyte macrophage colony-stimulating factor receptor
- Granulysin
- Granzyme
- Growth factor
- Gut-associated lymphoid tissue

== H ==
- H-Y antigen
- Hapten
- Hemocyte
- Hemolin
- Hepatocyte growth factor
- Heptavalent botulism antitoxin
- Herd immunity
- Heterophile
- Heterophile antigen
- Heterosubtypic immunity
- Histamine
- Histocompatibility
- Human leukocyte antigen
- Humoral immunity
- Hybridoma technology
- Hyperimmune globulin
- Hypersensitive response

== I ==
- Idiotopes
- Idiotype
- IL 10 family
- IL 17 family
- IL-12 and IL-12 Receptor β1 Mutations
- IL-2 receptor
- IL17RA
- IL17RB
- IL17RC
- IL18R1
- IL1A
- IL1B
- IL22RA1
- IL22RA2
- Immune adherence
- Immune complex
- Immune dysregulation
- Immune network theory
- Immune privilege
- Immune receptor
- Immune repertoire
- Immune system
- Immune tolerance
- Immunity (medical)
- Immunization
- Immunoadsorption
- Immunochemistry
- Immunocompetence
- Immunoconjugate
- Immunodermatology
- Immunodiagnostics
- Immunodominance
- Immunofixation
- Immunogen
- Immunogenetics
- Immunogenicity
- Immunoglobulin A
- Immunoglobulin class switching
- Immunoglobulin D
- Immunoglobulin E
- Immunoglobulin G
- Immunoglobulin heavy chain
- Immunoglobulin light chain
- Immunoglobulin M
- Immunoglobulin Y
- Immunohaematology
- Immunoisolate
- Immunologic activation
- Immunologic adjuvant
- Immunological synapse
- Immunology
- Immunomics
- Immunopathology
- Immunophysics
- Immunoproteomics
- Immunoreceptor tyrosine-based activation motif
- Immunoreceptor tyrosine-based inhibitory motif
- Immunosenescence
- Immunosignature
- Immunostaining
- Immunostimulant
- Immunosuppression
- Immunosurgery
- Immunotherapy
- Immunotoxicology
- Immunotoxin
- Immunotransplant
- Indoleamine 2,3-dioxygenase
- Induced-self antigen
- Inflammasome
- Inflammation
- Inflammatory reflex
- Innate immune system
- Innate lymphoid cell
- Inoculation
- Integrin alphaXbeta2
- Interferome
- Interferon
- Interferon beta 1a
- Interferon beta 1b
- Interferon gamma
- Interferon type I
- Interferon type II
- Interferon type III
- Interferon-alpha/beta receptor
- Interferon-gamma receptor
- Interferon-γ receptor 1 and 2 mutations
- Interleukin
- Interleukin 1 family
- Interleukin 1 receptor antagonist
- Interleukin 1 receptor, type II
- Interleukin 10
- Interleukin 10 receptor, alpha subunit
- Interleukin 10 receptor, beta subunit
- Interleukin 12
- Interleukin 12 subunit beta
- Interleukin 13
- Interleukin 16
- Interleukin 2
- Interleukin 20 receptor, alpha subunit
- Interleukin 23 subunit alpha
- Interleukin 28 receptor, alpha subunit
- Interleukin 34
- Interleukin 35
- Interleukin 6
- Interleukin 7
- Interleukin 7 receptor-α
- Interleukin 8
- Interleukin 8 receptor, alpha
- Interleukin 8 receptor, beta
- Interleukin receptor
- Interleukin-1 receptor
- Interleukin-1 receptor family
- Interleukin-1 receptor-associated kinase
- Interleukin-10 receptor
- Interleukin-11 receptor
- Interleukin-12 receptor
- Interleukin-13 receptor
- Interleukin-15 receptor
- Interleukin-17 receptor
- Interleukin-18 receptor
- Interleukin-20 receptor
- Interleukin-21 receptor
- Interleukin-22 receptor
- Interleukin-23 receptor
- Interleukin-27 receptor
- Interleukin-28 receptor
- Interleukin-3 receptor
- Interleukin-36
- Interleukin-4 receptor
- Interleukin-5 receptor
- Interleukin-6 receptor
- Interleukin-7 receptor
- Interleukin-7 receptor-α
- Interleukin-8 receptor
- Interleukin-9 receptor
- Intracellular antibody-mediated degradation
- Intravascular immunity
- Intrinsic immunity
- IRGs
- ISCOM
- Isoantibodies
- Isoantigen
- Isograft
- Isotype (immunology)

== J ==
- Janus kinase 3 deficiency
- Junctional diversity

== K ==
- Killer activation receptor
- Kinase tyrosine-based inhibitory motif
- Kinetic-segregation model of T cell activation

== L ==
- LANA
- Lck
- Lectin
- Leukemia inhibitory factor
- Leukemia inhibitory factor receptor
- Leukocyte extravasation
- Leukocyte-promoting factor
- Linear epitope
- Lipid A
- Lipopolysaccharide binding protein
- Low-affinity nerve growth factor receptor
- LPHN1
- Lymphocyte function-associated antigen 1
- Lymphokine
- Lymphoproliferative response
- Lymphotoxin
- Lymphotoxin alpha
- Lymphotoxin beta
- Lymphotoxin beta receptor
- Lysozyme

== M ==
- Macrophage
- Macrophage colony-stimulating factor
- Macrophage inflammatory protein
- Macrophage-activating factor
- Major histocompatibility complex
- Mannan-binding lectin
- MHC class I
- MHC class II
- MHC multimer
- MHC restriction
- Microantibody
- Microbial symbiosis and immunity
- MIMIC (immunology)
- Mimotope
- Minor histocompatibility antigen
- Mitogen
- Molecular mimicry
- Monoclonal antibody
- Monoclonal antibody therapy
- Monokine
- Mononuclear phagocyte system
- Monospecific antibody
- Mucosal immunology
- MYD88
- Myokine

== N ==
- Neoantigenic determinant
- Neopterin
- Neuroimmune system
- Neuroimmunology
- Neutralisation (immunology)
- NFAT
- Nicotinamide phosphoribosyltransferase
- Nitinol biocompatibility
- NKG2D
- Non-peptidic antigen
- Nonspecific immune cell
- Nuocyte
- Nutritional immunology

== O ==
- Ocular immune system
- Oligoclonal band
- Oligopeptidase
- Oncoantigen
- Oncostatin M
- Oncostatin M receptor
- Opportunistic infection
- Oprelvekin
- Opsonin
- Organ harvesting
- Organ transplantation
- Original antigenic sin
- Osteoimmunology
- Osteoprotegerin
- Outline of immunology

== P ==
- P110δ
- PAC-1
- Panel reactive antibody
- Pankomab
- Paraprotein
- Paratope
- Passenger leukocyte
- Passive immunity
- Pathogen-associated molecular pattern
- Pattern recognition receptor
- Pepscan
- Peptide microarray
- Peripheral tolerance
- PGG-glucan
- Phakellistatin 13
- Platelet factor 4
- Pleocytosis
- Polyclonal antibodies
- Polyclonal B cell response
- Polymersome
- Pox party
- Precipitin
- Premunition
- Premunity
- Primary and secondary antibodies
- Priming (immunology)
- Proinflammatory cytokine
- Promegakaryocyte
- Promegapoietin
- Promonocyte
- Psychoneuroimmunology
- Psychosomatic medicine
- PtERV1
- Pus

== R ==
- Rabbit hybridoma
- RANK
- RANKL
- Recombination signal sequences
- Recombination-activating gene
- Regular and irregular antibodies
- Reproductive immunology
- Respiratory burst
- Respiratory tract antimicrobial defense system
- Restriction modification system
- Rho(D) immune globulin

== S ==
- Secretion assay
- Self-protein
- Sensitization (immunology)
- Sentinel cell
- Serum amyloid A
- Short course immune induction therapy
- Sickness behavior
- Side-chain theory
- Somatic hypermutation
- Specific granule
- Specol
- STAT protein
- STAT1
- STAT2
- STAT3
- STAT4
- STAT5
- STAT6
- Stem cell educator
- Stimulator of interferon genes
- Stromal cell-derived factor 1
- Sublingual immunotherapy
- Superantigen
- Superoxide
- Surface probability
- Systemic acquired resistance
- Systems immunology

== T ==
- T-cell vaccination
- Talimogene laherparepvec
- Testicular immunology
- Tetrameric protein
- Tetraspanin
- TGF beta receptors
- Thymic nurse cell
- Thymic stromal lymphopoietin
- Thymus
- Thymus transplantation
- Tilomisole
- Timeline of immunology
- Titer
- Titermax
- Tn antigen
- TNF inhibitor
- TNFRSF10A
- TNFRSF10B
- TNFRSF10C
- TNFRSF10D
- TNFRSF12A
- TNFRSF13B
- TNFRSF13C
- TNFRSF14
- TNFRSF17
- TNFRSF18
- TNFRSF19
- TNFRSF21
- TNFRSF25
- Tolerance to infections
- Toxoid
- TPBG
- Transfer factor
- TRIF
- TRIM5alpha
- Trogocytosis
- Tuberculin
- Tumor necrosis factor alpha
- Tumor necrosis factor receptor
- Tumor necrosis factors
- Type I cytokine receptor
- Type II cytokine receptor

== U ==
- Unconventional protein secretion
- Uropod (immunology)
- UVB-induced apoptosis

== V ==
- V(D)J recombination
- Vaccine-naive
- Vermixocin
- Vernix caseosa
- Viral phylodynamics
- Virus quantification
- Voltage-gated proton channel

== W ==
- Wheat germ agglutinin
- White blood cell
- Widal test
- William B. Coley Award

== X ==
- XCL1
- XCL2
- XCR1
