= Dispanin =

CD225

Identifiers
- Symbol: CD225
- Pfam: PF04505
- InterPro: IPR007593
Available protein structures:
- PDB: IPR007593 PF04505 (ECOD; PDBsum)
- AlphaFold: IPR007593; PF04505

In molecular biology, the protein family Dispanin is another name for Interferon-induced transmembrane protein (IFITM). This refers to a family of protein domains which have a specific formation, or in other words, topology containing two alpha helices in within the cell membrane which are called two transmembrane proteins. This includes proteins such as CD225 (Cluster of Differentiation 225). The function of this protein family is to inhibit cell invasion of many harmful, pathogenic viruses, such as HIV. Henceforth, they are being intensively studied in the hope of drug discovery. They mediate the immune response by interferons.

== Function ==
Dispanins have a wide range of functions within the organism. It has a role to play in oncogenesis and germ cell development ( as well as cell adhesion and cell signalling.

In particular, IFITMs prevent HIV infection by preventing the virus from entering the host cell. It does this by S-palmitoylation, a process where fatty acids are added to an amino acid named cysteine. The process is crucial to the protein's antiviral properties and is of huge interest in research. Through studying Dispanin, it is hoped that its antiviral properties can be exploited, and then distributed in the form of medicines and vaccines.

Additionally, a type of dispanin, IFITM5, is expressed in cells that make bone, named osteoblasts. This is due to the important role dispanins play in strengthening the bone by bone mineralization.

== Structure ==
This protein family has two transmembrane helices. The precise crystal structure remains to be elucidated.

== Sequence Motifs ==
The sequences across a vast array of organisms, from bacteria to high level eukaryotes all contain the similar sequence motifs; in particular, double cysteine motif in the first transmembrane helix. This motif has recently been shown to undergo post-translational modification through S-palmitoylation. This is important since it increases hydrophobicity, and increases its anti-viral properties.

== Evolutionary history ==
Dispanins in eukaryotes and bacteria have high sequence similarities and share several conserved sequence motifs indication a common evolutionary ancestor.

== Human genes ==
There are a number of human genes which encode for Dispanin proteins, they are as listed below:

- IFITM: IFITM1, IFITM2, IFITM3, IFITM5
- PRRT2
- AC023157
- AL160276
- AC068580
- DSPC2
- TMEM233
- TMEM90A
- TMEM90B
- TMEM91
- TUSC5
