= DLA =

DLA may refer to:

== Entities and organizations ==
- DLA (TV), a Latin American television provider; see Intelsat 9 § Customers
- DLA Piper, an international law firm
- Defense Logistics Agency, United States
- Democratic Left Alliance (Poland), a Polish political party
- Dental Laboratories Association
- Douala International Airport, IATA airport code

== Science and technology ==
- Deep Learning Accelerator
- Drive Letter Access, a packet writing utility
- Drive letter assignment
- Drive Lock Assembly, a component of the Solar Alpha Rotary Joint
- Digital logic analyzer, a diagnostic tool for digital circuits
- Doctor of Liberal Arts, a degree
- Dog leukocyte antigen
- Diffusion-limited aggregation
- Damped Lyman-alpha system
- Dual-Lumen Airway, an emergency airway device

== Legislation and policy ==
- Disability Living Allowance, disability benefits in the UK
- Driver License Agreement
- Dominion Lands Act (Canada, 1872)
