= IFITM1 =

Protein-coding gene in the species Homo sapiens

Identifiers
- Aliases: IFITM1, 9-27, CD225, DSPA2a, IFI17, LEU13, interferon induced transmembrane protein 1
- External IDs: OMIM: 604456; GeneCards: IFITM1

Gene location (Human)
| Chr. | Chromosome 11 (human) |
| Band | 11p15.5 | Start | 310,041 bp |
| Band | 11p15.5 | End | 315,272 bp |
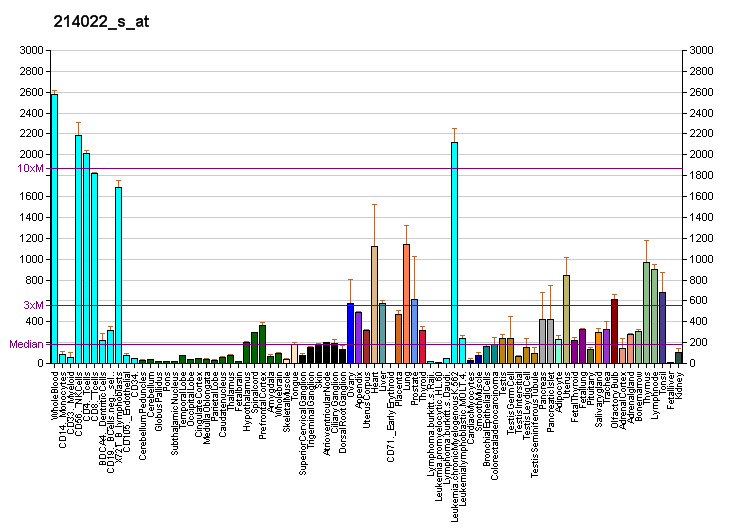

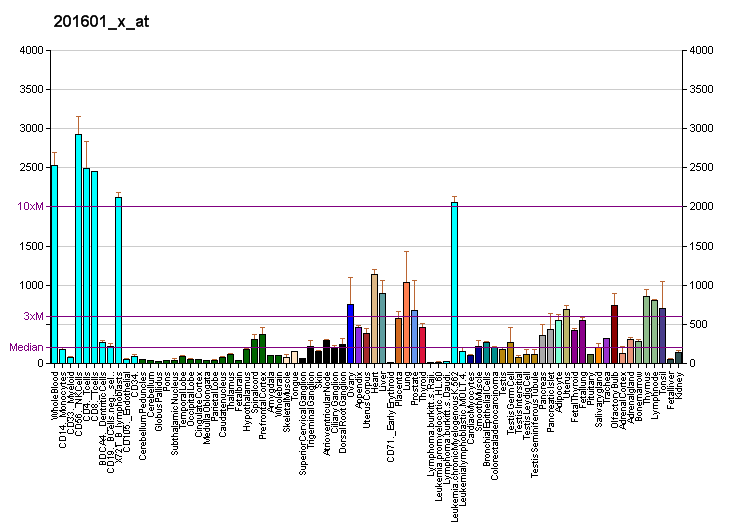
RNA expression pattern
| Bgee | Human / Mouse (ortholog); Top expressed in: right ovary; granulocyte; canal of the cervix; left uterine tube; left ovary; right uterine tube; corpus epididymis; spleen; ectocervix; body of uterus / n/a; More reference expression data |
| BioGPS | More reference expression data |
Gene ontology
| Molecular function | protein binding |
| Cellular component | integral component of membrane; membrane; plasma membrane; protein-containing complex |
| Biological process | negative regulation of viral entry into host cell; response to interferon-gamma; ossification; immune system process; response to virus; response to interferon-beta; response to biotic stimulus; cell surface receptor signaling pathway; negative regulation of viral genome replication; negative regulation of cell migration; positive regulation of osteoblast differentiation; defense response to virus; type I interferon signaling pathway; response to interferon-alpha; regulation of immune response; innate immune response; negative regulation of cell population proliferation |
Sources:Amigo / QuickGO
Orthologs
| Databases | NCBI: entry; OMA: entry |
| Species | Human | Mouse |
| Entrez | 8519 | n/a |
| Ensembl | ENSG00000185885 | n/a |
| UniProt | P13164 | n/a |
| RefSeq (mRNA) | NM_003641 | n/a |
| RefSeq (protein) | NP_003632 | n/a |
| Location (UCSC) | Chr 11: 0.31 – 0.32 Mb | n/a |
| PubMed search | | n/a |
- Wikidata
| View/Edit Human |

Interferon-induced transmembrane protein 1 is a protein that in humans is encoded by the IFITM1 gene. IFITM1 has also recently been designated CD225 (cluster of differentiation 225). This protein has several additional names: fragilis (human homolog of the mouse protein), IFI17 [interferon-induced protein 17], 9-27 [Interferon-inducible protein 9-27] and Leu13.

IFITM1 is a member of the IFITM family (Interferon-induced transmembrane protein) which is encoded by IFITM genes. The human IFITM genes locate on chromosome 11 and have four members: IFITM1, IFITM2, IFITM3 and IFITM5. While the mouse Ifitm genes locate on chromosome 7 and 16 and have six members: Ifitm1, Ifitm2, Ifitm3, Ifitm5, Ifitm6 and Ifitm7.

== Molecular biology ==
The IFITM1 gene is located on the Watson (plus) strand of the short arm of chromosome 11 (11p15.5) and is 3,956 bases in length. The encoded protein has 125 amino acids (molecular weight 13.964 kDa).

It is an intrinsic membrane protein and is predicted to cross the membrane several times.

== Structure and function ==
IFITM proteins have a short N-terminal and C-terminal domain, two transmembrane domains (TM1 and TM2) and a short cytoplasmic domain. The first transmembrane domain (TM1) and the cytoplasmic domain are conserved among different IFITM proteins in humans and mice. In the absence of interferon stimulation, IFITM proteins can express broadly in tissues and cell lines. In humans, IFITM1, IFITM2 and IFITM3 are able to express in different tissues and cells while the expression of IFITM5 is limited to osteoblasts. The type I and II interferon induce IFITM proteins expression significantly. IFITM proteins are involved in the physiological process of immune response signaling, germ cell maturation and development.

== Biochemistry ==
The gene is induced by interferon and the protein forms part of the signaling pathway.

== Antiviral function of IFITM proteins ==
IFITM proteins have been identified as cell-autonomous proteins that suppress the early stages of viral replication. Knockout of IFITM3 increased influenza A virus replication, and overexpression of IFITM3 inhibits influenza virus A replication. In addition to replication competent influenza A virus, IFITM proteins were able to inhibit retrovirus based pseudotyped influenza A virus, indicating that IFITM protein inhibit influenza A virus at the early step of life cycle, may occur in the entry and fusion steps.

IFITM proteins also are able to inhibit several infection with other enveloped viruses that belong to different virus families. These virus include flaviviruses (dengue virus and West Nile virus), filoviruses (Marburg virus and Ebola virus), coronaviruses (SARS coronavirus) and lentiviruses (Human Immunodeficiency Virus (HIV)). However, IFITM proteins did not affect alphavirus, arenavirus, or murine leukaemia virus infection.

IFITM proteins inhibit viral membrane and cellular endosomal or lysosomal vesicle membrane fusion by modifying their lipid components or fluidity. IFITM proteins block the hemifusion stage of entry, an intermediate stage in which portions the outer membranes of the target cell and the viral envelope mix prior to completion of fusion. Furthermore, IFITM proteins reduced membrane fluidity and affected membrane curvature to restrict viral membrane fusion with the cellular membrane. In addition, IFITM3 interacted with the cellular cholesterol regulatory proteins vesicle associated membrane protein A (VAPA) and oxysterol binding protein (OSBP) to induce intracellular cholesterol accumulation, which in turn blocks viral membrane and vesicle membrane fusion.
