= PGG =

PGG may refer to:

- Pentagalloyl glucose
- PGG-glucan, a type of beta-glucan
- Public goods game, a standard of experimental economics

pgg may refer to:

- Group pgg, a wallpaper group
- Pangwali language ISO 639-3 code
