= Herd effect =

Herd effect may refer to:

- Herd immunity
- Herd effect, a derogatory term for peer pressure, an easily manipulated population as a herd of sheep
