= Tolerogenic therapy =

- Specialty: Immunological

Tolerogenic therapy aims to induce immune tolerance where there is pathological or undesirable activation of the normal immune response. This can occur, for example, when an allogeneic transplantation patient develops an immune reaction to donor antigens, or when the body responds inappropriately to autoantigens implicated in autoimmune diseases. Research using animal models in transplantation and autoimmune diseases has led to early-phase human trials of tolerogenic therapy for autoimmune conditions like Type 1 Diabetes.

== Dendritic cells in tolerogenic therapy ==
Tolerogenic therapies employ the inbuilt tolerance mechanisms of a class of immune cells called dendritic cells. Dendritic cells are divided into two main subsets:

1. Mature dendritic cells are immunogenic. Their physiological role is to bridge innate and adaptive immune responses by presenting antigens to T-lymphocytes. In the presence of an inflammatory environment, which usually accompanies infection or tissue ‘danger’ signals, dendritic cells are activated (mature) and present foreign antigens to the T cells, initiating an appropriate immune response.
2. Semi-mature dendritic cells are tolerogenic. Conditions including the absence of an inflammatory environment result in the incomplete maturation of dendritic cells. Their influence on T-lymphocytes follows a different mechanism which induces tolerance, rather than immunogenicity.

Tolerogenic therapies are based on the principle that inducing the semi-mature phenotype in dendritic cells and then exposing them to the target antigen should allow antigen-specific induction of T-cell tolerance.

Tolerogenic dendritic cells induce tolerance through several mechanisms. Once stimulated, the dendritic cells migrate to the draining lymph node and present antigens to T cells via interaction of MHC class II-antigen complexes. This can induce T cell clonal deletion, T cell anergy or the proliferation of regulatory T cells (Tregs). Collectively, these mechanisms produce tolerance to specific antigens, which should help to prevent autoimmunity, but could therefore also be used as a therapy to induce tolerance to specific antigens implicated in autoimmune disease, or donor antigens in transplant patients.

== Mechanisms of therapy ==
Several methods of inducing tolerance based on this approach are currently being explored. Ex vivo tolerogenic dendritic cells can be induced through the addition of cytokines, pharmacological agents or genetic engineering techniques after their extraction from the patient. The DCs are then pulsed with the specific antigen to which tolerance is desired and these, now tolerogenic, cells can be injected back into the patient. Alternative methods include the direct injection of an inducing agent to induce semi-mature DCs in vivo.

== Animal models ==
Studies have suggested a role for tolerogenic dendritic cells in the treatment of diseases like type 1 diabetes mellitus and multiple sclerosis.

In animal models of Diabetes mellitus (NOD mice), GM-CSF induces resistance by increasing the frequency of regulatory T cells which can suppress T cell proliferation through their T-cell receptors. GM-CSF treated mice were found to have a semi-mature phenotype of dendritic cells which were inefficient at inducing antigen specific cytotoxic T cells compared to controls.

In multiple sclerosis research, EAE mice were completely protected from symptoms when injected with dendritic cells matured with TNF-α and antigen specific peptide compared to controls. T regulatory cells of mice treated with TNF-α produced IL-10, a cytokine which is able to inhibit the Th1 response therefore protecting against the Th1 dependent autoimmune EAE.

Mouse models of autoimmune thyroiditis showed that a semi-mature phenotype of dendritic cells is maintained after mouse thyroglobulin immunization in GM-CSF treated but not control mice. IL-10 produced by T regulatory cells was important in suppressing the mouse thyroglobulin specific T cell response and therefore protecting against Experimental autoimmune thyroiditis in mice.

Phase I studies into the safety and efficacy of tolerogenic DC therapy in humans have demonstrated the appropriateness of the therapy for further research. Future research will consider the effectiveness of tolerogenic therapies in a number of planned clinical trials into autoimmune diseases.

== See also ==
- Short course immune induction therapy
- Inverse vaccine
