= Regular and irregular antibodies =

Regular and irregular antibodies are two main groups of antibodies when classified roughly on the timing and triggering event of antibody production.

Regular antibodies usually refer to the isohemagglutinins, directed against antigens of the ABO system. They appear in the first years of life. They are of the IgM type. It is not certain whether they are natural antibodies (being produced without any previous infection, vaccination, other foreign antigen exposure or passive immunization) or are caused by infection in early life.

Irregular antibodies are all non-ABO antibodies, although the main use of the term is for non-ABO isoantibodies that may cause incompatibility in blood transfusions. Irregular antibodies are most commonly of the IgG type, and they appear first after exposure to foreign antigens. However, even the ABO antibodies are hypothesized to originate from foreign antigen exposure in early life.
