= Leukocyte-promoting factor =

Category of substances produced by neutrophils when they encounter a foreign antigen

Leukocyte-promoting factor, more commonly known as leukopoietin, is a category of substances produced by neutrophils when they encounter a foreign antigen. Leukopoietin stimulates the bone marrow to increase the rate of leukopoiesis in order to replace the neutrophils that will inevitably be lost when they begin to phagocytose the foreign antigens.

Leukocyte-promoting factors include colony stimulating factors (CSFs) (produced by monocytes and T lymphocytes), interleukins (produced by monocytes, macrophages, and endothelial cells), prostaglandins, and lactoferrin.

== See also ==
- White blood cell
- Leukocytosis
- Complete blood count
- Indium-111 WBC scan
- Leukocyte extravasation
