= Transformer protein =

Protein able to interconvert between multiple folds

A transformer protein (TFP) also known as a metamorphic protein is a protein that can interconvert between two or more shapes (also known as folds) each having a different function.

The fold of a protein is defined by how the two-dimensional linear protein polypeptide folds up into a three-dimensional structure. Most proteins adopt a single stable fold. But some proteins have marginal structural stability and can rapidly interconvert between two or more folds. Protein structures in a given environment were thought to be defined completely by their amino acid sequence. These protein structures are usually related to one single physiological protein activity. This hypothesis was, however, challenged by observations that proteins could fold in two alternative conformations, such as the prion proteins which exist in a physiologically active cellular form and an insoluble form.

It has been estimated that up to four percent of proteins may have this fold chaining property. Examples of metamorphic proteins include XCL1, RfaH, and KaiB.

== RfaH ==
Extending the concept of a protein that exists in a soluble and an insoluble form, for the bacterial transcription factor RfaH two entirely different structures were observed to coexist in solution. RfaH is a two-domain protein, the C-terminal domain (CTD) of which can fold into alpha-helical and, alternatively, into beta-barrel form. These two interconvertible structures have two different functions, in alpha-helix form the CTD inhibits binding of the N-terminal domain to the RNA-polymerase, whereas the beta-barrel form recruits ribosomes. RfaH is thus the first member of the transformer protein class which obviously violates the original 'one sequence - one structure - one function' suggestion that governed protein research for decades .

== See also ==
- Moonlighting protein
