= Oncoantigen =

An oncoantigen is a surface or soluble tumor antigen that supports tumor growth. A major problem of cancer immunotherapy is the selection of tumor cell variants that escape immune recognition. The notion of oncoantigen was set forth in the context of cancer immunoprevention to define a class of persistent tumor antigens not prone to escape from immune recognition.

== Features of oncoantigens ==
=== Extracellular localization ===
Localization of oncoantigens outside tumor cells allows recognition by antibodies if downregulation of class I major histocompatibility complex (MHC-I) molecules prevents T cell recognition. Most tumor antigens are intracellular proteins. Circulating antibodies do not penetrate inside cells, hence intracellular proteins are only recognized by T cells as MHC-I-bound antigenic peptides exposed on the surface of tumor cells. However downmodulation or complete loss of MHC-I expression occurs in most human tumors, making them altogether invisible to the immune system of the host. When tumor cells downregulate MHC-I, only antigens expressed on the cell surface and/or secreted in the extracellular fluids can be recognized by antibodies.

=== Support of the neoplastic phenotype ===
Loss of oncoantigen expression is unlikely, because oncoantigens support tumor growth. Loss of tumor antigen expression is another cause of escape from immune recognition. This occurs because most tumor antigens are not essential for tumor growth. Hence loss of expression does not decrease the fitness of cancer cells. In contrast, downmodulation of molecules like oncogene products, which are essential for tumor growth, would impair tumor cells.
The complete dependence (also called "addiction") of tumor growth from a given gene product can cease if further genetic alterations occur that activate alternative signaling pathways. Thus, the persistence of oncoantigens is not an absolute property, but rather a feature of specific stages of tumor development.

== Identification of oncoantigens ==
The prototypic oncoantigen is HER2/neu, a membrane tyrosine kinase similar to the epidermal growth factor receptor (EGFR, or HER-1), expressed in about one-fourth of breast cancers. Vaccines against HER2/neu were shown to prevent mammary carcinoma in HER2/neu transgenic mice and are being tested for cancer therapy in humans. Monoclonal antibodies against HER-2 (e.g. trastuzumab) are approved for therapy of human breast cancer.
Other molecules fulfilling the definition of oncoantigen are EGFR/HER-1, the mucin MUC1 and the idiotype of B and T cell malignancies. Further candidates are receptor tyrosine kinases and growth factors, but in most cases the induction of effective anti-tumor immune responses against such molecules remains to be demonstrated.
Most tumor antigens are not oncoantigens, either because they are intracellular molecules, like cancer-testis antigen such as MAGE family members, or because they appear to be dispensable without significant alterations of tumorigenicity, like the carcinoembryonic antigen (CEA) or the prostate specific antigen (PSA). Novel strategies will be required to identify new oncoantigens amenable to human application.

== Applications of oncoantigens ==
Prevention of mouse mammary carcinoma with vaccines against HER2/neu led to the development of the oncoantigen concept, thanks to the addiction of transgenic tumors to HER-2 expression and to the fundamental role of vaccine-induced anti-HER-2 antibodies in the arrest of tumor development. Oncoantigens are thought to be the ideal target for immunologic prevention of cancer in individuals at risk, because the continuous generation of precancerous or early cancerous cells might easily lead over time to the emergence of antigen- or MHC-loss escape variants.
As escape variants are a major cause of failure also in cancer immunotherapy, it is likely that targeting oncoantigens with vaccines or antibodies will have a stronger clinical impact than attempts at targeting other tumor antigens. The problem so far in using vaccines in oncoantigen research is that the vaccines are typically not long lasting. This is because of the heterogeneous nature of cancer cells. Vaccinations may help the immune system locate certain oncoantigens such as MET, RET, CD20 and CD22. However; cells that evade the immune system begin to populate and thus cause the growth of a more resistant tumor. There is a use of oncoantigens as markers for faster diagnosis of cancer. The oncoantigens presented from cancerous cells can be used in genomics as biomarkers. This can help in faster and easier diagnosis of cancer. Oncoantigens may have a use in cancer research in the future through such advances.
