= Specol =

Specol (trade name Stimune) is a water in oil adjuvant composed of defined and purified light mineral oil (Stills. 2005). It has been suggested as an alternative to Freund's adjuvant for hyperactivation of the immune response in rabbits (Leenaars et al. 1994). Specol can be used for antigens of low immunogenicity and can be administered equally effectively by the subcutaneous or intraperitoneal routes. The histological lesions produced are fewer than those produced by using Complete Freund's adjuvant. However, pain and distress following administration of these 2 adjuvants seem to be similar (based on limited data).
