= Immunosignature =

Medical diagnostic test

Immunosignaturing is a medical diagnostic test which uses arrays of random-sequence peptides to associate antibodies in a blood sample with a disease.

== How it works ==
=== Random Peptide Array ===
Early immunosignature tests used glass microscope slides, with spots of 10,000 random peptides. Newer immunosignature work is run on wafers made of silicon dioxide, with each wafer cut into standard slide size and spotted with 330,034 peptides; however, further description will focus on the glass slide experiments. These random-sequence peptides, 20 amino acids long, are chemically attached to the slides. Of the 20 amino acid length, 3 amino acids (at the C-terminus side of the peptide) are common to each peptide spot. This 3 amino acid segment is used as the linker by which the 17 amino acid chain ("17-mer") is attached to the slide. The 17-mer is the "random peptide", with a random sequence selected by the use of a random number generator. This randomness makes the immunosignature technology different from existing technology to identify disease states via biomarkers, because the 10,000 unique, random peptides per slide are not specifically selected for containing particular sequences. The random sequences are not selected for containing known epitopes, or antibody binding sites, of pathogens. When a sample of diluted blood serum (containing antibodies) is applied to the surface of the peptide microarray, the 17-mers are long enough that there are multiple potential epitopes on each individual peptide.

=== Antibody Binding ===
Antibodies are present in the diluted serum sample, and are considered significant to the health of the patient, because if antibodies remain present even in the diluted serum sample, they must reasonably have been present at relatively high amounts in the blood of the patient. This collection of antibodies will bind to regions of some of the random sequence peptides. The antibodies in the serum sample will vary among patients, depending on their health or disease state. Once antibodies have been allowed to bind to the peptides on the microarray, the array is washed (to remove any unbound serum particles or antibodies). After washing, the array now has the 10,000 random peptides, and an unknown number of antibodies bound to some of those peptides.

=== Antibody Detection ===
To detect those human antibodies, the array is covered with a solution of a fluorescently labeled secondary antibody. This secondary antibody binds to the patient antibody already on the array from the diluted serum sample, and since this secondary antibody is fluorescently labeled, it is detectable using fluorescence microscopy. After the microarray is washed to remove unbound secondary antibody, and dried via centrifugation, it is scanned using fluorescence microscopy, and the pattern of peptide spots with bound antibodies versus those without antibodies becomes visible. This pattern is called the immunosignature.

== Medical applications ==
Immunosignaturing has many applications in current medical research and testing, such as diagnosing valley fever infections and determining if a vaccine will be effective at protecting patients from disease.

=== Valley Fever Diagnosis ===
In the American southwest, where fungal infections of valley fever are a problem, the immunosignature platform has been tested as a way to detect infection in patients. Valley fever infections, when symptomatic, appear similar to the common flu, progressing to pneumonia-like symptoms. Current valley fever testing is unreliable, especially in patients with other infections (such as HIV), and a confident diagnosis can take weeks. Further complicating this testing, in a slim percent of cases patients do not develop any detectable antibody against the fungus. Current testing can also be invasive and more demanding than an immunosignature array, ranging from a sputum test or blood test, to bronchoscopy (the latter is more invasive in addition to taking longer to get a result). Confounding the issue of valley fever, of the 40% of patients showing symptoms, many will be mis-diagnosed with other conditions or not recognized as infected with valley fever. Using the peptide array, scientists were able to determine a distinct immunosignature for valley fever infections, even when the patients had other respiratory infections as well. The immunosignature was also clearly differentiated from that of healthy patients.

=== Vaccine Efficacy ===
Immunosignatures were used to test if the efficacy of a vaccine could be predicted (in mice), using different strains of the influenza virus. Mice were given a seasonal flu vaccine, or a vaccine against the specific flu virus tested in the study (PR8). The mice were then infected with the PR8 flu strain. Those groups of mice which were given the PR8-specific vaccine not only survived, but did not display any symptoms of the flu. The mice which received either of the two seasonal flu vaccines all developed flu symptoms, and some (20-40%, depending on which seasonal vaccine received) were killed by the PR8 infection.

The group of mice which received sub-lethal infection doses of PR8, and the group of mice which received vaccines of killed PR8, had different immunosignatures. The two groups of mice immunized with the seasonal flu vaccines also had immunosignatures which were distinct from each other. This demonstrates that the immunosignature platform can be used to distinguish between very similar vaccines. The immunosignature of known protection (here, the signature of mice immunized with the killed virus), was compared to the immunosignatures of the mice groups given less protective vaccines. The more protective a mouse's vaccine was, the closer that mouse's immunosignature was to the protected signature.

=== Cancer Detection ===
As the immunosignature platform is useful for any disease which engages the immune system, it was tested to determine if distinct immunosignatures could be determined for various cancers. Using the 10,000 peptide array, comparing against healthy control samples was used to establish immunosignatures for the five different cancers tested. Healthy versus cancer state samples were distinguishable, but there was a slight overlap of the signatures among the cancers. This resulted in a loss of specificity in distinguishing between cancers using immunosignatures. To resolve this, peptides were determined to be statistically significant in the cancer signatures using more stringent selection processes. This eliminated the peptides in common between various cancers, and this selection of peptides was used to distinguish between the cancers, with 95% specificity.

== Patent and commercialization ==
Patent: "Compound Arrays for Sample Profiling", WO 2,010,148,365, inventor(s): Johnston, Stephen A; Stafford, Phillip.

HealthTell acquired the Immunosignature patent in 2012 and is commercializing the human diagnosis capabilities using high throughput manufacturing. For more information: http://www.healthtell.com/
