= Passenger leukocyte =

Type of cell

In tissue and organ transplantation, the passenger leukocyte theory is the proposition that leucocytes within a transplanted allograft sensitize the recipient's alloreactive T-lymphocytes, causing transplant rejection.

The concept was first proposed by George Davis Snell and the term coined in 1968 when Elkins and Guttmann showed that leukocytes present in a donor graft initiate an immune response in the recipient of a transplant.

== Immunogenicity reduction research ==
An experimental study using rat islet allografts found that dendritic cells, which are a type of passenger leukocyte, play a key role in the initiation of transplant rejection. In the 1984 study, donor dendritic cells were subjected to UV irradiation before the transplantation. This treatment significantly reduced their ability to activate the recipient's T cells in mixed lymphocyte reactions or MLRs. This resulted in graph survival increasing from an average of 4.6 days to 18 days in patients with no immunosuppressive drug intake.

A second study in 1984 (Faustman et al.) illustrated that donor dendritic cells, an essential component of the passenger leukocyte population, were insufficient to trigger acute rejection of pancreatic islet allografts in mice. Donor islets that were pretreated with a dendritic specific antibody, 33D1, resulted in survival of over 200 days. Untreated grafts were rejected within 12 days.

Additionally, a 1995 study demonstrated that obstructing the CD40-CD40L pathway using an anti-CD40L antibody could result in regulation in immune activity of the donor lymphocytes. This, along with donor lymphocyte pretreatment, prolonged the pancreatic islet allograft survival in mice, sometimes permanently. Emphasizing the role of passenger leukocyte-derived costimulation when it comes to graft rejection and demonstrated that disrupting it could induce transplant tolerance without physically removing donor leukocytes.

Recent findings suggest that passenger leukocytes may also impair graft quality through innate immune pathways. In a 2023 study using ex vivo lung perfusion showed that donor derived leukocytes that underwent pyroptosis negatively affected the viability of lung grafts prior to transplantation. Nearly 26% of cells recovered during ex vivo lung perfusion were pyroptotic leukocytes. Additionally lungs with higher proportions of these cells showed reduced oxygenation capacity and increased inflammatory cytokines. This suggests that the minimizing of the immunogenicity may reduce the risk of rejection and improve graft viability and function.

Beyond cell depletion and costimulation studies, researchers have examined how the movement and fate of passenger leukocytes influence transplant outcomes. In a 2013 mouse liver transplant study, donor derived leukocytes were found to migrate rapidly to recipient lymphoid organs, with T and B cells reaching the lymph nodes and spleen within 1.5 hours after transplantation. In contrast, NK and NKT cells remained primarily in the liver. The study also showed early activation of recipient CD8⁺ T cells between 2 and 5 hours post transplant, followed by rapid deletion within 24 to 48 hours, a level of deletion greater than previously reported. This may help explain the frequent spontaneous acceptance seen in liver allografts. The findings suggest that migration patterns of different leukocyte subsets can influence immune response and that the spleen and lymph nodes may play distinct roles in tolerance induction.

=== Reevaluation ===
A 2016 study published in Science Immunology challenged the prevailing passenger leukocyte theory by showing that donor derived exosomes, not intact leukocytes, are the main drivers of T cell activation after transplantation. These exosomes, which carry donor MHC molecules, were taken up by recipient antigen presenting cells and displayed through a process called MHC cross-dressing. Recipient APCs presenting donor MHC robustly activated alloreactive T cells in both lab assays and mouse models of skin and heart transplants. In contrast, donor leukocytes appeared in low numbers and had minimal impact on T cell responses. The findings suggest that exosomes could play a more central role in early transplant rejection than previously recognized.

== See also ==
- History of immunology
