= Kinase tyrosine-based inhibitory motif =

Type of motif in immunology

The term Kinase tyrosine-based inhibitory motif (KTIM) was coined by a group of immunology researchers from McGill University, Montreal, Quebec, Canada in 2008 to represent any immunoreceptor tyrosine-based inhibitory-like sequence motif, with the consensus sequence I/V/L/SxYxxL/V, found in a kinase and regulating its activity.

One major way in which cells respond to stimuli is through signal transduction pathways, whereby a ligand binds to a receptor, causing conformational changes that lead to a cascade of events in intracellular signalling molecules. This ultimately ends up in the translocation of transcription factors to the nucleus altering the expression of target genes, therefore affecting specific cellular functions. One way activation signals can be counteracted is through the triggering of different receptors bearing immunoreceptor tyrosine-based inhibitory motifs (ITIMs) in their cytoplasmic tails.

Several transmembrane receptors are negatively regulated through recruiting cytosolic SH2 domain-containing proteins such as SHP-1 to immunoreceptor tyrosine-based inhibitory motifs (ITIMs) that they possess. ITIM-like motifs (KTIMs) were shown to exist in non-receptor proteins and to play a key role in their regulation.

== Difference between KTIM and ITIM ==
The main difference between ITIM and KTIM is that KTIM was shown to be found in a cytosolic protein (IL-1 receptor-associated Kinase 1 (IRAK-1)) and not in a transmembrane protein such as the case with ITIMs.

== KTIM function ==
KTIMs are speculated to play a regulatory role in the negative regulation of many kinases in addition to IRAK-1, and can thus represent a novel regulatory mechanism in a wide range of cellular kinases. The mode of action of KTIMs is similar to ITIMs and involves recruiting SH2 domain-containing proteins such as SHP-1.
