= Phakellistatin 13 =

Names
- IUPAC name Cyclo(glycyl-L-prolyl-L-threonyl-L-leucyl-L-tryptophyl-L-prolyl-L-phenylalanyl)
- Systematic IUPAC name Cyclo(glycyl-L-prolyl-L-threonyl-L-leucyl-L-tryptophyl-L-prolyl-L-phenylalanyl)

Identifiers
CAS Number	493012-52-5
3D model (JSmol)	Interactive image
ChEBI	CHEBI:181743
ChEMBL	ChEMBL510827
ChemSpider	9300779
PubChem CID	11125657
CompTox Dashboard (EPA)	DTXSID901045610
- InChI: InChI=1S/C42H54N8O8/c1-24(2)19-30-38(54)47-32(21-27-22-43-29-14-8-7-13-28(27)29)42(58)50-18-10-16-34(50)39(55)45-31(20-26-11-5-4-6-12-26)37(53)44-23-35(52)49-17-9-15-33(49)40(56)48-36(25(3)51)41(57)46-30/h4-8,11-14,22,24-25,30-34,36,43,51H,9-10,15-21,23H2,1-3H3,(H,44,53)(H,45,55)(H,46,57)(H,47,54)(H,48,56)/t25-,30+,31+,32+,33+,34+,36+/m1/s1 Key: GCYCNNNVEBIXIM-SKOSDCFOSA-N; InChI=1/C42H54N8O8/c1-24(2)19-30-38(54)47-32(21-27-22-43-29-14-8-7-13-28(27)29)42(58)50-18-10-16-34(50)39(55)45-31(20-26-11-5-4-6-12-26)37(53)44-23-35(52)49-17-9-15-33(49)40(56)48-36(25(3)51)41(57)46-30/h4-8,11-14,22,24-25,30-34,36,43,51H,9-10,15-21,23H2,1-3H3,(H,44,53)(H,45,55)(H,46,57)(H,47,54)(H,48,56)/t25-,30+,31+,32+,33+,34+,36+/m1/s1 Key: GCYCNNNVEBIXIM-SKOSDCFOBM
- SMILES: C[C@H]([C@H]1C(=O)N[C@H](C(=O)N[C@H](C(=O)N2CCC[C@H]2C(=O)N[C@H](C(=O)NCC(=O)N3CCC[C@H]3C(=O)N1)CC4=CC=CC=C4)CC5=CNC6=CC=CC=C65)CC(C)C)O

Properties
Chemical formula	C_{42}H_{54}N_{8}O_{8}
Molar mass	798.942 g·mol^{−1}
- Except where otherwise noted, data are given for materials in their standard state (at 25 °C [77 °F], 100 kPa). Infobox references

Phakellistatin 13 is a cytotoxic cycloheptapeptide isolated from marine sponge.
