= XCL1 =

Protein-coding gene in humans

Identifiers
- Aliases: XCL1, ATAC, LPTN, LTN, SCM-1, SCM-1a, SCM1, SCM1A, SCYC1, X-C motif chemokine ligand 1
- External IDs: OMIM: 600250; MGI: 104593; GeneCards: XCL1
Available structures
PDB	Ortholog search: PDBe RCSB
PDB	List of PDB id codes 1J8I, 1J9O, 2HDM, 2JP1, 2NYZ, 2N54

Gene location (Human)
Chr.	Chromosome 1 (human)
Band	1q24.2	Start	168,576,605 bp
Band	1q24.2	End	168,582,069 bp

Gene location (Mouse)
Chr.	Chromosome 1 (mouse)
Band	1 H2.2|1 72.26 cM	Start	164,759,213 bp
Band	1 H2.2|1 72.26 cM	End	164,763,096 bp
RNA expression pattern
Bgee	Human / Mouse (ortholog); Top expressed in: granulocyte; spleen; lymph node; gallbladder; rectum; olfactory zone of nasal mucosa; mucosa of transverse colon; right lobe of liver; appendix; right uterine tube / Top expressed in: thymus; granulocyte; mesenteric lymph nodes; spleen; blood; choroid plexus of fourth ventricle; right kidney; secondary oocyte; jejunum; uterus; More reference expression data
BioGPS	n/a
Gene ontology
Molecular function	chemokine receptor binding; cytokine activity; protein homodimerization activity; chemokine activity; CCR chemokine receptor binding; protein binding
Cellular component	extracellular region; extracellular space
Biological process	cellular response to transforming growth factor beta stimulus; cellular response to interleukin-4; release of sequestered calcium ion into cytosol; negative regulation of interferon-gamma production; positive regulation of T-helper 1 cell cytokine production; monocyte chemotaxis; positive regulation of interleukin-10 production; positive regulation of natural killer cell chemotaxis; chemokine-mediated signaling pathway; positive regulation of CD4-positive, alpha-beta T cell proliferation; cellular response to tumor necrosis factor; cell-cell signaling; positive regulation of thymocyte migration; response to virus; positive regulation of T cell mediated cytotoxicity; positive regulation of release of sequestered calcium ion into cytosol; negative regulation of T-helper 1 type immune response; negative regulation of DNA-binding transcription factor activity; neutrophil chemotaxis; chemotaxis; positive regulation of leukocyte chemotaxis; positive regulation of GTPase activity; positive regulation of granzyme A production; positive regulation of immunoglobulin production in mucosal tissue; negative regulation of T cell cytokine production; positive regulation of T cell cytokine production; cellular response to interleukin-1; positive regulation of T cell chemotaxis; mature natural killer cell chemotaxis; regulation of inflammatory response; positive regulation of ERK1 and ERK2 cascade; positive regulation of neutrophil chemotaxis; cellular response to interferon-gamma; immune response; positive regulation of B cell chemotaxis; positive regulation of transforming growth factor beta production; negative regulation of CD4-positive, alpha-beta T cell proliferation; positive regulation of T-helper 2 cell cytokine production; negative regulation of transcription, DNA-templated; positive regulation of CD8-positive, alpha-beta T cell proliferation; negative regulation of interleukin-2 production; negative regulation of T-helper 1 cell activation; positive regulation of granzyme B production; signal transduction; antimicrobial humoral immune response mediated by antimicrobial peptide; regulation of signaling receptor activity; G protein-coupled receptor signaling pathway; inflammatory response; lymphocyte chemotaxis
Sources:Amigo / QuickGO
Orthologs
Databases	NCBI: entry; OMA: entry
Species	Human	Mouse
Entrez	6375	16963
Ensembl	ENSG00000143184	ENSMUSG00000026573
UniProt	P47992	P47993
RefSeq (mRNA)	NM_002995	NM_008510
RefSeq (protein)	NP_002986	NP_032536
Location (UCSC)	Chr 1: 168.58 – 168.58 Mb	Chr 1: 164.76 – 164.76 Mb
PubMed search
- Wikidata
View/Edit Human	View/Edit Mouse

Chemokine (C motif) ligand 1 also known as lymphotactin is a protein that in humans is encoded by the XCL1 gene. XCL1 is a small cytokine belonging to the C chemokine family that signals exclusively through its receptor XCR1. Produced primarily by activated CD8+ T cells and natural killer (NK) cells, XCL1 functions as a chemoattractant for specific immune cell populations, particularly XCR1-positive conventional dendritic cells (cDC1s), thereby orchestrating immune responses to infection and inflammation.

Chemokines are known for their function in inflammatory and immunological responses. This family C chemokines differs in structure and function from most chemokines. There are only two chemokines in this family and what separates them from other chemokines is that they only have two cysteines; one N-terminal cysteine and one cysteine downstream. These both are called lymphotactin, alpha and beta form, and claim special characteristics only found between the two. Lymphotactins can go through a reversible conformational change which influences its binding.

== Gene ==
In humans, XCL1 is closely related to another chemokine, XCL2, which is located at the same genomic locus on the long arm of chromosome 1 (band q24.2). Both genes share strong genetic and functional similarities; however, XCL2 has only been identified in humans and not in mice.

The XCL1 gene spans approximately 6,017 base pairs and contains three exons and two introns, along with multiple transcription start sites. It encodes a 114-amino acid protein that differs from most chemokines by lacking the first and third conserved cysteine residues. As a result, XCL1 contains only one disulfide bond rather than the typical two or three found in other chemokines. Despite their similarity, the genes for XCL1 and XCL2 exhibit subtle but notable differences. Both belong to the C chemokine subfamily, characterized by a single disulfide bond and nearly identical tertiary structures. Their genomic sequences include conserved flanking regions, such as promoter regions, and other non-coding elements important for gene regulation.

Gene mapping has revealed that the structure of XCL1 and XCL2 is largely conserved, with a key distinction in the first intron. XCL1 contains a complete sequence encoding the 60S ribosomal protein L7a, whereas in XCL2, part of this region is truncated. The only difference in the mature proteins is the amino acid composition at positions 7 and 8, which may contribute to functional differences between the two chemokines. One limitation in comparative studies of XCL1 and XCL2 is that XCL2 has not been observed in mice, making functional comparisons across species more difficult.

== Tissue distribution ==
In normal tissues, XCL1 is found in high levels in the spleen, thymus, small intestine, and peripheral blood leukocytes, and at lower levels in the lung, prostate gland, and ovary. Secretion of XCL1 is responsible for the increase of intracellular calcium in peripheral blood lymphocytes. Cellular sources for XCL1 include activated thymic and peripheral blood CD8^{+} T cells. NK cells also secrete XCL1 along with other chemokines early in infections. XCR1-expressing dendritic cells (DC) are a major target of XCL1.

== Structure ==
A defining feature of XCL1 is its unique structural configuration. Unlike most chemokines, which possess two disulfide bonds linking the N-terminus to the protein core, XCL1 contains only a single disulfide bond. This structural simplification alters its protein tertiary structure, distinguishing it from other members of the chemokine family.

XCL1 is classified as a metamorphic protein, capable of reversibly switching between two distinct conformations—Ltn10 and Ltn40—both of which are biologically active. At lower temperatures (10 °C), XCL1 exists predominantly as a monomeric form known as Ltn10, while at higher temperatures (40 °C), it adopts a dimeric conformation called Ltn40. These reversible structural states are essential to its function, influencing receptor binding and chemokine activity.

== Function ==
XCL1 exerts its chemotactic activity by binding to its cognate chemokine receptor, XCR1. XCL1 is expressed by various cell types, including macrophages, fibroblasts, and specific lymphocytes. The XCL1–XCR1 axis plays a critical role in antigen cross-presentation, antigen uptake, and the induction of both innate and adaptive cytotoxic immune responses. XCR1 is selectively expressed on a subset of conventional dendritic cells, which are specialized for presenting extracellular antigens via MHC class I to CD8^{+} T cells. XCL1 is secreted by activated NK cells and antigen-specific CD8^{+} T cells, often alongside other cytokines such as IFN-γ. This interaction facilitates effective antigen cross-presentation by dendritic cells.

== Clinical significance ==
XCL1 appears to be involved in the pathogenesis of rheumatoid arthritis (RA). It is expressed on synovial lymphocytes and contributes to the accumulation of T cells in inflamed joints. A recent study shows that neutralizing XCL1 mitigates brain damage and reduces lymphocyte and dendritic cell recruitment after intracerebral hemorrhage in mice.
