= Rabbit hybridoma =

Group of cells

A rabbit hybridoma is a hybrid cell line formed by the fusion of an antibody producing rabbit B cell with a cancerous B-cell (myeloma).

== History ==
The rabbit immune system has been documented as a vehicle for developing antibodies with higher affinity and more diverse recognition of many molecules including phospho-peptides, carbohydrates and immunogens that are not otherwise immunogenic in mouse. However, until recently, the type of antibodies available from rabbit had been limited in scope to polyclonal antibodies. Several efforts were made to generate rabbit monoclonal antibodies after the development of mouse hybridoma technology in the 1970s. Research was conducted into mouse-rabbit hetero-hybridomas to make rabbit monoclonal antibodies. However, these hetero-hybridomas were ultimately difficult to clone, and the clones, generally unstable, and did not secrete antibody over a prolonged period of time.

== Initial fusion partner ==
In 1995, Katherine Knight and her colleagues, at Loyola University of Chicago, succeeded in developing a double transgenic rabbit over-expressing the oncogenes v-abl and c-myc under the control of the immunoglobulin heavy and light chain enhancers. The rabbit formed a myeloma-like tumor, allowing the isolation of a plasmacytoma cell line, named 240E-1. Fusion of 240E-1 cells with rabbit lymphocytes produced hybridomas that secreted rabbit monoclonal antibodies in a consistent manner. However, like the early mouse myeloma lines developed in the 1970s, stability was a concern. A number of laboratories which had received the 240E-1 cell line from Dr. Knight's laboratory reported stability problems with the fusion cell line 240E-1.

== Improved fusion partner ==
In 1996, Weimin Zhu and Robert Pytela, at the University of California San Francisco (UCSF), obtained 240E-1 from Dr. Knight's laboratory and attempted to develop an improved rabbit hybridoma. Improvements in the characteristics of 240E-1 were accomplished by repeated subcloning, selection for high fusion efficiency, robust growth, and morphological characteristics such as a bright appearance under a phase-contrast microscope. Selected subclones were further tested for their ability to produce a stable hybridoma and monoclonal antibody secretion. After multiple rounds of subcloning and selection processes, a new cell line named 240E-W, was identified and which expressed better fusion efficiency and stability. Cell line 240E-W has since been further developed and optimized for production of rabbit monoclonal antibodies for research and commercial applications.

== Process ==
The process of hybridoma formation in a rabbit first entails obtaining B-cells from a rabbit that has been immunized. There are numerous immunization protocols for rabbit, notably for the generation of polyclonal antibodies. After immunization, B-cells are fused with a candidate rabbit fusion partner cell line to form hybridomas. Resulting antibodies from hybridomas are screened for an antigen which meets criteria of interest by diagnostic tests such as ELISA, western blot, immunohistochemistry, and FACS. The resulting hybridomas may be subcloned to ensure monoclonal characteristics.

== Humanization of rabbit antibodies ==
Mitchell Ho and Ira Pastan at National Cancer Institute (Bethesda, USA) isolated a group of rabbit monoclonal antibodies (e.g. YP218, YP223) that recognize rare epitopes of mesothelin, including poorly immunogenic sites close to the C terminal end, for cancer therapy. Dr. Ho's laboratory analyzed the complex structures of rabbit antibodies with their antigens from the Protein Data Bank, and identified antigen-contacting residues on the rabbit Fv within the 6 Angstrom distance to its antigen. They named "HV4" and "LV4", non-complementarity-determining region (CDR) loops that are structurally close to the antigen and located in framework 3 of the rabbit heavy chain and light chain, respectively. Based on computational structural modeling, Ho and Zhang designed a humanization strategy by grafting the combined Kabat/IMGT/Paratome CDRs into a human germline framework sequence. The immunotoxins composed of the humanized rabbit Fvs (e.g. hYP218) fused to a clinically used toxin showed stronger cytotoxicity against tumor cells than the immunotoxins derived from their original rabbit Fvs. The CAR T cells based on the hYP218 antibody also show effective inhibition of tumor growth in mice. The method (i.e. grafting combined Kabat/IMGT/Paratome rabbit CDRs to a stable human germline framework) has been suggested as a general approach to humanizing rabbit antibodies.
