= Janus kinase 3 deficiency =

- Other names: JAK3 deficiency

JAK3 (Janus kinase 3) deficiency is a dysfunction in cytokine receptor signalling and their production of cytokines.

JAK3 is a tyrosine protein kinase, an enzyme that is encoded by the JAK3 gene. It is a kinase that is activated only by cytokines whose receptors contain the common gamma chain subunit (IL-2, IL-4, IL-7, IL-9, IL-15 and IL-21). JAK3 is involved in initiating signalling for the cytokine receptors because they itself lack enzymatic activity. Once activated, the JAK kinase phosphorylates specific tyrosine residues on the cytokine receptor subunits which then activate STAT transcription factors. JAK3 helps to regulate differentiation and maturation of B cells, T cells and NK cells.

Mutations in the JAK3 gene can cause dysfunction of the kinase leading to autosomal severe combined immunodeficiency (SCID) disease or on the contrary, the activation of mutated JAK3 can lead to development of leukemia. The JAK3 tyrosine kinase is mutated in 10% to 16% of T-cell acute lymphoblastic leukemia (T-ALL) cases.

Patients with JAK3-deficiency lack the necessary immune cells, meaning that they do not have T cells and NK cells but have normal level but poorly functioning B cells. The necessary immune cells have resistance and ability to fight off certain bacteria, viruses, and fungi. The patients are then prone to repeated and persistent infections that can be very serious or life-threatening.

Affected infants typically develop chronic diarrhea, a fungal infection in the mouth called oral thrush (candidiasis), pneumonia, and skin rashes. Constant illness also causes slower development of the affected individuals. Without treatment, people with JAK3-deficient SCID usually live only into early childhood.

== Diagnosis ==
In suspection of a genetic mutation after physical examination, checking personal and family medical history and laboratory tests (measuring levels of certain substances or biochemical test of the blood and urine) can be used genetic testing as certain diagnosis. Genetic testing identifies changes in chromosomes, genes, or proteins. However, some conditions do not have a specific genetic test; either the genetic cause of the condition is unknown or a test has not yet been developed. In these cases, a combination of the approaches listed above may be used to make a diagnosis.

== Treatment ==
The treatment for JAK3 deficiency is allogeneic hematopoietic stem cell transplantation, which has been demonstrated to be life-saving for affected patients.

Another option is gene therapy that has the potential to become an alternative treatment for JAK3 deficiency. Because of the clinical and biochemical similarities between JAK3 deficiency and X-linked severe combined immunodeficiency, genetic correction and engraftment of autologous hematopoietic stem cells can presume restoring of immunity in JAK3-deficient patients.

== See also ==
- List of cutaneous conditions
