= Short course immune induction therapy =

Short Course Immune Induction Therapy or SCIIT, is a therapeutic strategy employing rapid, specific, short term-modulation of the immune system using a therapeutic agent to induce T-cell non-responsiveness, also known as operational tolerance. As an alternative strategy to immunosuppression and antigen-specific tolerance inducing therapies, the primary goal of SCIIT is to re-establish or induce peripheral immune tolerance in the context of autoimmune disease and transplant rejection through the use of biological agents (compare also tolerogenic therapy). In recent years, SCIIT has received increasing attention in clinical and research settings as an alternative to immunosuppressive drugs currently used in the clinic, drugs which put the patients at risk of developing infection, cancer, and cardiovascular disease.

== Induction of immunological tolerance ==
Immune tolerance can be defined as the ability of the immune system to distinguish between self and non-self, or harmless and harmful. T-cells are able to distinguish between self and non-self largely through their T-cell receptor, or TCR. Immune tolerance is maintained by central and peripheral tolerance. During central tolerance, T-cells are selected in the thymus and allowed to enter the periphery based on the ability of the T-cell to recognize self-peptides (via its TCR) being presented in the context of self-MHC. If the TCR binds the peptide-MHC complex with high affinity, the T cell is deleted from the host. In a healthy individual, this process eliminates the majority of T-cells that are self-reactive, although a few T-cells will escape thymic deletion. However, these potentially self-reactive cells in the periphery are held in check by a number of regulatory mechanisms such as active suppression by regulatory T cells(Tregs), clonal anergy, deletion, and ignorance. While autoimmunity is thought to result from the breakdown of central and peripheral tolerance, undesirable immune responses such as transplant organ rejection occur when the immune system is working properly and recognizes the transplanted organ as being non-self, leading to rejection of the transplanted tissue. In this context, manipulating the immune system to recognize the transplanted organ as self for the induction of immunological tolerance would be beneficial for the establishment of transplant tolerance.

As autoimmunity and organ transplant rejection are inextricably linked to T-cell activation and differentiation, it is apposite that T-cells are the primary target of modern tolerance induction strategies. Current strategies for the treatment of T-cell mediated pathologies employ long-term, broad immunosuppressive drugs, which are moderately effective in limiting T-cell responses but carry unfavorable side effects, such as organ toxicity, risk of infection, and cancer. Due to the adverse risks associated with immunosuppressive drugs, it became apparent that the ideal strategy would be antigen-specific: a therapy that was able to inhibit the antigen-specific T-cell response, but would still leave the remainder of the immune system intact to defend against infection. These strategies employed the use of soluble peptide tolerance and oral peptide tolerance to great efficacy in experimental settings, however, all have failed to translate into the clinic. One reason for the failure of these strategies is that T-cell mediated organ destruction is now understood to be a complex event involving epitope spreading to multiple tissue-specific antigens and cryptic epitopes. Thus, at any given stage of disease or rejection, the T-cell response is likely to be heterogenic, involving multiple TCR specificities, leading to difficulties in prescribing the antigen, dosing, and timing of administration required to induce tolerance. While antigen-specific tolerance induction is an attractive strategy, it's limited by a lack of knowledge, and because of its stringent requirements, a slightly broader approach is more practical.

SCIIT attempts to occupy the middle ground of immuno-therapeutics by avoiding the dangerous side effects of general immunosuppressive therapy, while alleviating the stringent demands of antigen-specific tolerance induction. SCIIT aims to achieve this by targeting receptor-ligand interactions that provide signals that are critical for the survival, activation, and function of T-cells in the periphery.

== T-Cell Receptor Targeting ==
T-cell receptor stimulation is the primary signal required for the activation and differentiation of T-cells. Recognition of specific antigen through the interaction of the TCR with its cognate antigen/MHC complex leads to a cascade of effects ultimately leading to T cell-mediated immunity. It is with good reason that some of the most promising tolerance inducing therapies have targeted the TCR and its co-receptors.

=== αCD3 antibody treatment ===
The most promising therapy to make use of targeting the T-cell through its receptor is the class of monoclonal antibodies specific for CD3. The CD3 chains compose the signaling arm of the TCR, translating the strength of binding affinity of the TCR/peptide-MHC complex to downstream cytoplasmic signals. Initial studies involving αCD3 as a therapy used Fc receptor(FCR)-binding monoclonal antibodies, which proved to be very efficacious. A short, 5-day course of FcR-binding, anti-CD3 antibody treatment was able to re-establish peripheral tolerance in animal models of autoimmune disease, thereby completely reversing disease. The mechanism of action caused systemic depletion of T-cells from the blood and sites of inflammation. While effective, the FcR-binding antibodies deliver strong stimulatory signals to the T-cell, leading to activation-induced-cell-death, and largely depleting T-cells from the periphery and site of inflammation. This effect was transient, and mice were able to mount normal immune responses to exogenous antigens within weeks of treatment. However, treatment with FcR-binding anti-CD3 antibody such as OKT3 induced strong stimulation of T-cells, leading to T-cell cytokine release, which resulted in a number of symptoms when administered to patients. In lieu of this, a mutant version of the antibody was developed that lacked the ability to bind FcR. This mutant form of the anti-CD3 acts by only delivering a partial signal to the T-cell, leading to inactivation, deletion, and anergy induction. Results from a clinical trial in 2000 showed that treatment with the modified form of anti-CD3 preserved islet function in new-onset Type 1 diabetics. Data from follow up studies suggest that anti-CD3 antibody treatment caused not only anergy induction and transient depletion of T cells, but an increase in CD4+ and CD8+ Foxp3+Tregs. While promising, islet function gradually decreased over time in human patients treated with anti-CD3 antibodies, and data suggest that the mitogenic capabilities of anti-CD3 antibodies may overcome their therapeutic utility. Although current clinical trials are ongoing to improve the efficacy of anti-CD3 antibody treatment, alternative targets within the TCR may provide a better therapeutic T cell target.

=== Campath-1H ===
Although it is not thought to directly target components of the TCR/CD3 complex, Alemtuzumab, or Campath-1H, has been utilized because of its strong ability to deplete T cells, in many cases for up to 3 years. It is a monoclonal antibody that targets CD52, a protein that is expressed on the surface of mature lymphocytes. Originally approved for B cell cancers, its use has spread to off-label indications. One such indication includes renal transplantation, whereby its use remains controversial. This is not because the antibody is not extremely efficient at immune-suppressing patients, but due to the inherent risk of patients developing serious complications. Furthermore, the use of Alemtuzumab in transplantation may also be a question related to reimbursement, as it is comparably cheaper to other drugs used to treat clinical episodes of transplant rejection, and it can significantly shorten the duration of a patient's hospital visit. Alemtuzumab is now being tested in clinical trials for the treatment of autoimmune diseases, such as Multiple Sclerosis, where it has shown considerable promise at preventing multiple sclerosis symptoms in Relapsing-Remitting patients. However, many patients treated with alemtuzumab went on to develop other autoimmune diseases, especially those involving the thymus, as well as a plethora of infections. In general, the data suggest that alemtuzumab is excellent at inducing immune suppression. However, as a SCITT agent, it appears to overstep the required immune modulation, placing patients at unnecessary risk.

=== TCR αβ antibody treatment ===
Antibodies directed against the αβ chains of the TCR have also been shown to be efficacious for the induction and restoration of immunological tolerance in animal models of autoimmunity and transplantation. Like anti-CD3 antibodies, the administration of anti-TCR αβ antibodies has generally been met with favorable effects in the treatment of autoimmune disease. Treatment of mice with anti-TCR αβ antibody at the time of Experimental autoimmune encephalomyelitis(EAE) disease induction completely prevented disease onset, while treatment during chronic EAE disease caused disease remission. Anti-TCR αβ antibody treatment induces tolerance through a number of mechanisms including the functional blockade of T cells at the site of inflammation, transient T-cell depletion, upregulation of Th2 cytokines, and an increase in the regulatory NKT cell population. In transplantation, the use of anti-TCR αβ antibody treatment may be more efficacious than anti-CD3 antibody treatment, and its potential for prolonging allograft survival has been demonstrated in multiple animal models of transplantation, such as renal allografts, heterotopic heart transplants, and corneal transplants. While this has yet to be defined completely, this is likely the combined result of preserving γδ T cells and the lack of mitogenic effects observed when peripheral blood monocytes are incubated with anti-αβ TCR antibodies. The ability for anti-αβ TCR antibodies to modulate T cells without inducing significant cytokine release is likely due in part because the αβ TCR lacks immunoreceptor tyrosine-based activation motifs (ITAM's). The ability for targeting the αβ TCR with monoclonal antibodies to prevent renal transplant rejection is currently the focus of the phase 2 clinical trial.

=== Disadvantages of T-cell directed immune induction therapies ===
Due to the activation, depletion, and immunosuppression following the administration of T-cell depleting therapies, there is a risk of infection to the patient. The most common infection is caused by the reactivation of latent Epstein–Barr virus infection. EBV reactivation in the context of T-cell depleting strategies can result in serious complications, such as post-transplant lymphoproliferative disorder, which can have fatal consequences. However, in a European clinical study using anti-CD3 antibody treatment, patients previously infected with EBV had a transient incidence of EBV reactivation during treatment. The infection was self-limiting and did not return during the 4 years following treatment cessation, nor was it associated with any severe complications.
