= Alloantigen recognition =

Alloantigen recognition refers to immune system recognition of genetically encoded polymorphisms among the genetically distinguishable members of same species (self-non-self discrimination). Post-transplant recognition of alloantigens occurs in secondary lymphoid organs. Donor specific antigens are recognized by recipient's T lymphocytes and triggers adaptive pro-inflammatory response which consequently leads to rejection of allogenic transplants. Allospecific T lymphocytes may be stimulated by three major pathways: direct recognition, indirect recognition or semidirect recognition. The pathway involved in specific cases is dictated by intrinsic and extrinsic factors of allograft and directly influence nature and magnitude of T lymphocytes mediated immune response. Furthermore, variant tissues and organs such as skin or cornea or solid organ transplants can be recognized in different pathways and therefore are rejected in different fashion.

== Direct alloantigen recognition ==
Population of antigen presenting cells (APCs) is localized inside donor's tissues and is co-transferred from donor to recipient via transplant procedure. This population is therefore called "passenger cells". Short after transplantation to new host these cells (especially dendritic cells) leave their intra-graft habitat and migrate through lymphatic system to regional lymphatic nodes. Inside the lymphatic nodes these dendritic cells are confronted with recipient's naïve T lymphocytes and their contact culminate in recognition of allogenic MHC (major histocompatibility complex)- peptide complex displayed on the surface of the passenger cells. This phenomenon is called direct recognition and leads to acute rejection of allografts mediated by specialized CD4+T lymphocytes and CD8+ T lymphocytes.

== Indirect alloantigen recognition ==
Second route of allorecognition mimics normal antigen mechanism of T lymphocytes stimulation by nominal antigens. In this case the alloantigens derived from graft are internalized, processed and presented in form of peptides by recipient's APCs on their MHC II molecules. Rejection mediated by T lymphocytes sensitized by direct allorecognition pathway is predominant in the short period after the transplantation, but usually subsides with depletion of passenger cells while indirect recognition contributes to continuing graft damage and plays role in chronic rejection.

== Semi-direct alloantigen recognition (cross-dressing) ==
The third pathway of recognition also involve donor APCs, but in this case are their membrane components fused with recipient APCs and therefore can present intact donor MHC molecules to the host. This is possible by unique ability to exchange molecules such as RNA or proteins which is well established among leukocytes. There are several possibilities how this can be achieved: cell-cell contact (trogocytosis), nanotubes or release of extracellular vesicles such as exosomes. Myeloid antigen presenting cells and dendritic cells in particular are one of the major exosome producers. There are known especially for their ability to transport functional MHC molecules with bonded antigen peptide (pMHC) to different cells population including other dendritic cells. In consequence these dendritic cells which acquired new pMHC, displayed on their surface, became "cross-dressed". This pMHC is capable of normal antigen presentation to effectors cells. Usually, the mechanism of cross-dressing serves purposes of amplifying immune response to certain antigens, but in case of alloantigen recognition the APCs are able, thanks to this mechanism, to prime both direct and indirect T lymphocytes by expressing both self- MHC and allo- MHC peptides derived from donor passenger APCs. Semi-direct alloantigen recognition therefore contributes to acute rejection by eliciting response of specialized CD4+ and CD8+ T lymphocytes.
