= Titermax =

Immune adjuvant

Titermax is a mixture of compounds used in antibody generation and vaccination to stimulate the immune system to recognise an antigen given together with the mixture. Titermax is a developed immune adjuvant.

It is a water-in-oil emulsion and consists of squalene, an emulsifier (sorbitan monooleate 80), a patented block copolymer and microparticulate silica (Stills 2005). Toxicity seems to be lower than other water in oil adjuvant such as Freund's adjuvant. The efficacy to elicit an immune response against antigens of low immunogenicity is however subject to debate.

== See also ==
- Polyclonal antibodies, esp. section on Titermax
- Immunologic adjuvant
