= Premunition =

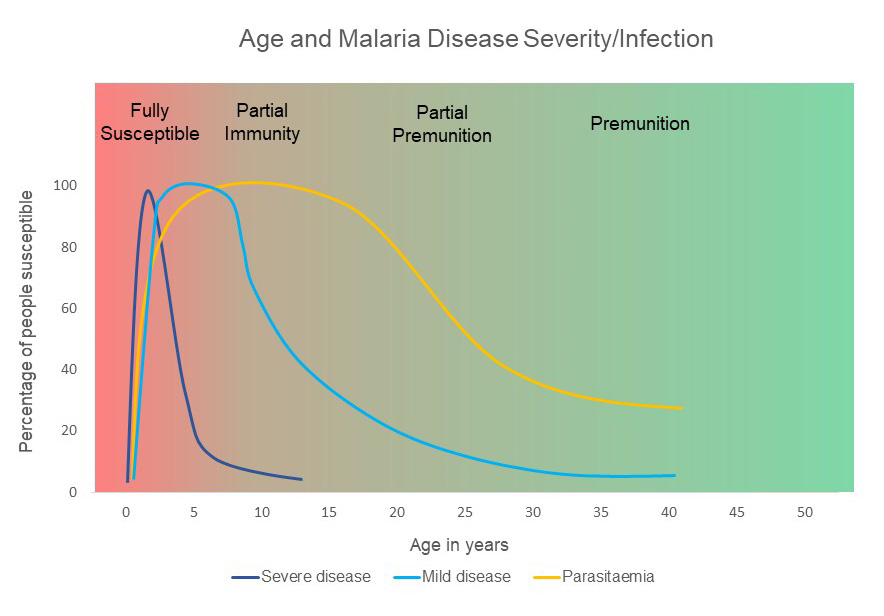
Graph depicting premunition in malaria. Adapted from White, Nicholas J; Pukrittayakamee, Sasithon; Hien, Tran Tinh; Faiz, M Abul; Mokuolu, Olugbenga A; Dondorp, Arjen M (2014). "Malaria". The Lancet. 383 (9918). Elsevier BV: 723–735. doi:10.1016/s0140-6736(13)60024-0. ISSN 0140-6736. PMID 23953767. S2CID 208794141.

Premunition, also known as infection-immunity, is a host response that protects against high numbers of parasite and illness without eliminating the infection. This type of immunity is relatively rapid, progressively acquired, short-lived, and partially effective. For malaria, premunition is maintained by repeated antigen exposure from infective bites. Thus, if an individual departs from an endemic area, he or she may lose premunition and become susceptible to malaria.

Antibody action contributes to premunition. However, premunition is probably much more complex than simple antibody and antigen interaction. In the case of malaria, the sporozoite and merozoite stages of Plasmodium elicit the antibody response which leads to premunition. Immunoglobulin E targets the parasites and leads to eosinophil degranulation which releases major basic protein that damages the parasites, and other factors elicit a local inflammatory response. However, Plasmodium can change its surface antigens, so the development of an antibody repertoire that can recognize multiple surface antigens is important for premunition to be achieved.

Premunition has not been well-studied, and although it likely occurs broadly, it is mainly emphasized for its role in malaria, tuberculosis, syphilis and relapsing fever.

Premunization is the artificial induction of premunition.

Premunity is progressive development of immunity in individuals exposed to an infective agent, mainly belonging to protozoa and Rickettsia, but not in viruses. After the initial infection, which generally occurs in childhood, the effect in subsequent infections is diminished. Infections thereafter may exhibit little or no symptomatology in spite of parasitemia. The next stage is resistance to infection altogether.

Loss of premunity is estimated to be the cause of the rebound of malaria in 1965, in India after the dramatic success of the National Malaria Control Programme that was launched for rural India in 1953.

Premunity occurs in infections of babesiosis, malaria Onchocerca volvulus, and Trichomonas.

== See also ==
- Herd immunity
- Adaptive immune system
