= Promegapoietin =

Drug given during chemotherapy to increase blood cell regeneration

Promegapoietin is a drug given during chemotherapy to increase blood cell regeneration. It is a colony-stimulating factor that stimulates megakaryocyte production.

It functions by stimulating ligands for interleukin 3 and c-Mpl.
