= Dental Laboratories Association =

DLA
- Dental Laboratories Association
- Founded: 1961
- Headquarters: Nottingham, UK
- Location: United Kingdom
- Members: 1000 (2007)
- Key people: Gordon Watters, chairman Jonathan Bill, vice chairman Richard Daniels, chief executive Betty Doody, financial director
- Affiliations: Orthodontic Technicians Association
- Website: www.dla.org.uk

The Dental Laboratories Association (DLA) is the professional body for dental laboratory owners in the United Kingdom. It is estimated that members of the DLA are responsible for over 80 per cent of the dental laboratory services in the UK.

== Origin ==
The DLA began as a division of the Surgical Instrument Manufacturers Association, later becoming a separate entity. The first meeting of the DLA Council took place in London in 1961. The first secretary was John Wrench, and administration was provided by a firm of accountants called Hughes Allan.

In 1977 Trevor Roadley, a Nottingham dental laboratory owner, was appointed as secretary. Operating initially at his laboratory and then in the DLA's first premises, Roadley gradually built up the range of member services and heightened the standing of the association. The DLA moved to larger premises in Nottingham in 1986, a converted chapel that was being used as a dental laboratory. At this stage the DLA had approximately 400 members. In 1987 Bill Courtney took over as secretary. Like Roadley before him, Courtney was a dental laboratory owner and member of the DLA Council.

The DLA regularly met with organisations such as the General Dental Council, Orthodontic Technicians Association, British Dental Association and the Department of Health. The DLA has presented evidence to the Health Select Committee at the House of Commons on the challenges faced by the profession.

The DLA was instrumental in setting up the Dental Technicians Education and Training Advisory Board (DTETAB), which is now known as the Dental Technologists Association (DTA). The late 1980s and early 1990s saw the emergence of the Medical Devices Directive and the introduction of Quality Systems to the industry. The DLA worked to establish an industry-led standard. The first example of this was a system based on BS 5750 called the Certification Authority for Dental Laboratories and Suppliers (CADLAS), which is still operating as AMTAC MEDICA and is now audited to ISO9002. With the lessons learned in setting up CADLAS, a new system called the Dental Appliance Manufacturers Audit Scheme (DAMAS) was launched in 1998. This is based around ISO 9000 and also addresses the Medical Devices Regulations (MDR).

By now the association membership had risen to over 900, and the association moved into new offices at Arboretum Gate in February 1997.

There have been many changes since 2000, including the retirement of Bill Courtney and appointment of Richard Daniels as chief executive. Membership has passed the 1,000 mark, and the DLA is building a profile as a campaigning organisation with appearances across the media.

== Offices ==
In May 2001 the association moved to their current offices on Wollaton Road, Beeston in Nottingham.

== Logo ==
The DLA logo is circular, with the initials "DLA" in the middle.

== Memberships ==
The DLA is a member of the British Dental Health Foundation (BDHF), the Royal Society for the Prevention of Accidents (RoSPA) and the Federation of European Dental Laboratory Owners (FEPPD).

== Events ==
As the flagship event of the Dental Laboratories Association (DLA), the Dental Technology Showcase (DTS) is a platform for dental technicians, clinical dental technicians and lab owners to update and refresh their knowledge and skills.

Held alongside the Dentistry Show since 2014, the event offers networking opportunities as well as education, verifiable CPD and access to latest innovations in the UK industry.

Past events have been attended by thousands of dental professionals. Past trade exhibitions have hosted leading dental suppliers and manufacturers including 3Shape, Bracon, Cendres + Metaux, Nobel Biocare, Straumann, Metrodent, Ivoclar Vivadent and Schottlander, each demonstrating the latest products, materials and technologies available.

== Council ==
The DLA Council is the governing body of the association and is elected by the members. Its chairman is Gordon Watters. The DLA is run by the Nationally Elected Council. All member laboratories may send an observer to council meetings.
