= Unconventional protein secretion =

A process by which molecules are produced and released from a cell, gland or organ.

Unconventional protein secretion (known as ER/Golgi-independent protein secretion or nonclassical protein export) represents a manner in which the proteins are delivered to the surface of plasma membrane or extracellular matrix independent of the endoplasmic reticulum or Golgi apparatus. This includes cytokines and mitogens with crucial function in complex processes such as inflammatory response or tumor-induced angiogenesis. Most of these proteins are involved in processes in higher eukaryotes, however an unconventional export mechanism was found in lower eukaryotes too. Even proteins folded in their correct conformation can pass plasma membrane this way, unlike proteins transported via ER/Golgi pathway. Two types of unconventional protein secretion are these: signal-peptid-containing proteins and cytoplasmatic and nuclear proteins that are missing an ER-signal peptide (1).

== Signal-peptide-containing proteins ==
These proteins contain a specific signal-peptide sequence, which is to be translated into the endoplasmic reticulum, but are, however, able to reach the cell surface unconventionally. They can be packed into a COPII-coated vesicle and directly fuse with plasma membrane or can fuse with endosomal or lysosomal compartment. Alternatively, they can be packed into non-COPII-coated vesicle as well and fuse with Golgi (before reaching plasma membrane) or directly delivered to the plasma membrane.

== Cytoplasmatic/nuclear secretory proteins ==
Soluble proteins can reach the surface of the cell both by non-vesicular and vesicular mechanisms. Non-vesicular mechanisms use a carrier to get proteins into extracellular space (for example phosphatidylinositol-4,5-bisphosphate). Vesicular mechanisms can use the lysosome-dependent pathway, microvesicle shedding or biogenesis of multivesicular bodies.
