= XCL2 =

Protein found in humans

Identifiers
- Aliases: XCL2, SCM-1b, SCM1B, SCYC2, chemokine (C motif) ligand 2, X-C motif chemokine ligand 2
- External IDs: OMIM: 604828; MGI: 104593; GeneCards: XCL2

Gene location (Human)
Chr.	Chromosome 1 (human)
Band	1q24.2	Start	168,540,768 bp
Band	1q24.2	End	168,543,997 bp

Gene location (Mouse)
Chr.	Chromosome 1 (mouse)
Band	1 H2.2|1 72.26 cM	Start	164,759,213 bp
Band	1 H2.2|1 72.26 cM	End	164,763,096 bp
RNA expression pattern
Bgee	Human / Mouse (ortholog); Top expressed in: granulocyte; spleen; blood; lymph node; bone marrow; duodenum; appendix; epithelium of colon; placenta; right lobe of liver / Top expressed in: thymus; granulocyte; mesenteric lymph nodes; spleen; blood; choroid plexus of fourth ventricle; right kidney; secondary oocyte; jejunum; uterus; More reference expression data
BioGPS	n/a
Gene ontology
Molecular function	cytokine activity; protein binding; CCR chemokine receptor binding; chemokine activity
Cellular component	extracellular region; extracellular space
Biological process	monocyte chemotaxis; chemokine-mediated signaling pathway; cellular response to tumor necrosis factor; blood circulation; neutrophil chemotaxis; chemotaxis; positive regulation of GTPase activity; cellular response to interleukin-1; immune response; positive regulation of ERK1 and ERK2 cascade; cellular response to interferon-gamma; lymphocyte chemotaxis; inflammatory response; signal transduction; regulation of signaling receptor activity; G protein-coupled receptor signaling pathway; positive regulation of T cell chemotaxis
Sources:Amigo / QuickGO
Orthologs
Databases	NCBI: entry; OMA: entry
Species	Human	Mouse
Entrez	6846	16963
Ensembl	ENSG00000143185	ENSMUSG00000026573
UniProt	Q9UBD3	P47993
RefSeq (mRNA)	NM_003175	NM_008510
RefSeq (protein)	NP_003166	NP_032536
Location (UCSC)	Chr 1: 168.54 – 168.54 Mb	Chr 1: 164.76 – 164.76 Mb
PubMed search
- Wikidata
View/Edit Human	View/Edit Mouse

Chemokine (C motif) ligand 2 (XCL2) is a small cytokine belonging to the XC chemokine family that is highly related to another chemokine called XCL1. It is predominantly expressed in activated T cells, but can also be found at low levels in unstimulated cells. XCL2 induces chemotaxis of cells expressing the chemokine receptor XCR1. Its gene is located on chromosome 1 in humans.
