= Surface probability =

In immunology, surface probability is the amount of reflection of an antigen's secondary or tertiary structure to the outside of the molecule.

A greater surface probability means that an antigen is more likely to be immunogenic (i.e. induce the formation of antibodies).
