= Tilomisole =

Names
- Preferred IUPAC name [3-(4-Chlorophenyl)[1,3]thiazolo[3,2-a][1,3]benzimidazol-2-yl]acetic acid

Identifiers
CAS Number	58433-11-7
3D model (JSmol)	Interactive image
ChEMBL	ChEMBL2104737
ChemSpider	38987
KEGG	D06148
PubChem CID	42747
UNII	651G60U372
CompTox Dashboard (EPA)	DTXSID40207137
- InChI: InChI=1S/C17H11ClN2O2S/c18-11-7-5-10(6-8-11)16-14(9-15(21)22)23-17-19-12-3-1-2-4-13(12)20(16)17/h1-8H,9H2,(H,21,22)
- SMILES: Clc4ccc(c1c(sc2nc3ccccc3n12)CC(=O)O)cc4

Properties
Chemical formula	C_{17}H_{11}ClN_{2}O_{2}S
Molar mass	342.80 g·mol^{−1}
- Except where otherwise noted, data are given for materials in their standard state (at 25 °C [77 °F], 100 kPa). Infobox references

Tilomisole (WY-18,251) is an experimental drug which acts as an immunomodulator and has been studied for the treatment of some forms of cancer.
