= XCR1 =

Protein-coding gene in the species Homo sapiens

Identifiers
- Aliases: XCR1, CCGPR5, X-C motif chemokine receptor 1
- External IDs: OMIM: 600552; MGI: 1346338; GeneCards: XCR1

Gene location (Human)
Chr.	Chromosome 3 (human)
Band	3p21.31	Start	46,016,990 bp
Band	3p21.31	End	46,085,825 bp

Gene location (Mouse)
Chr.	Chromosome 9 (mouse)
Band	9 F4|9 74.71 cM	Start	123,681,380 bp
Band	9 F4|9 74.71 cM	End	123,691,094 bp
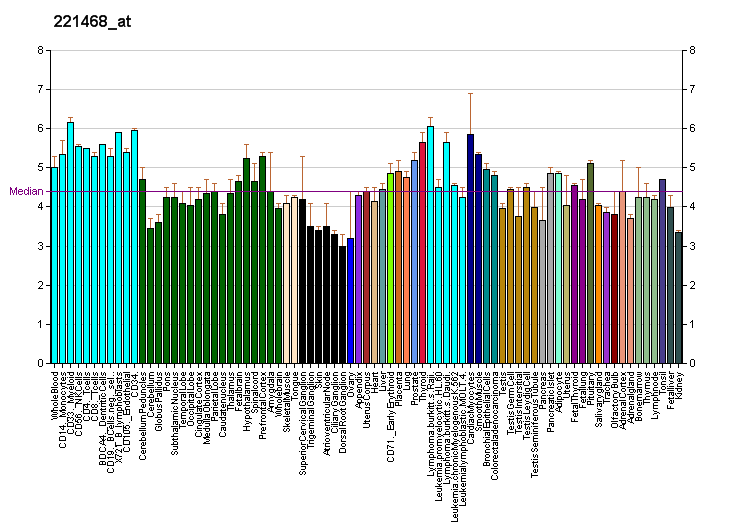
RNA expression pattern
Bgee	Human / Mouse (ortholog); Top expressed in: gonad; testicle; lymph node; appendix; pancreatic ductal cell; gallbladder; skin of leg; skin of abdomen; decidua; mucosa of transverse colon / Top expressed in: morula; embryo; thymus; mesenteric lymph nodes; spleen; blastocyst; meninges; right kidney; duodenum; jejunum; More reference expression data
BioGPS	More reference expression data
Gene ontology
Molecular function	G protein-coupled receptor activity; chemokine receptor activity; signal transducer activity; C-C chemokine receptor activity; chemokine binding; C-C chemokine binding
Cellular component	integral component of membrane; plasma membrane; integral component of plasma membrane; membrane; external side of plasma membrane
Biological process	positive regulation of cytosolic calcium ion concentration; chemotaxis; G protein-coupled receptor signaling pathway; G protein-coupled receptor signaling pathway, coupled to cyclic nucleotide second messenger; inflammatory response; signal transduction; chemokine-mediated signaling pathway; immune response; calcium-mediated signaling; cell chemotaxis
Sources:Amigo / QuickGO
Orthologs
Databases	NCBI: entry; OMA: entry
Species	Human	Mouse
Entrez	2829	23832
Ensembl	ENSG00000173578	ENSMUSG00000060509
UniProt	P46094	Q9R0M1
RefSeq (mRNA)	NM_005283; NM_001024644; NM_001381860	NM_011798
RefSeq (protein)	NP_001019815; NP_005274; NP_001368789	NP_035928
Location (UCSC)	Chr 3: 46.02 – 46.09 Mb	Chr 9: 123.68 – 123.69 Mb
PubMed search
- Wikidata
View/Edit Human	View/Edit Mouse

The "C" sub-family of chemokine receptors contains only one member: XCR1, the receptor for XCL1 and XCL2 (or lymphotactin-1 and -2).

XCR1 is also known as GPR5.

== Function ==
The protein encoded by this gene is a chemokine receptor belonging to the G protein-coupled receptor superfamily. The family members are characterized by the presence of 7 transmembrane domains and numerous conserved amino acids. This receptor is most closely related to RBS11 and the MIP1-alpha/RANTES receptor. It transduces a signal by increasing the intracellular calcium ions level. The viral macrophage inflammatory protein-II is an antagonist of this receptor and blocks signaling. Two alternatively spliced transcript variants encoding the same protein have been found for this gene.

Cross-presenting dendritic cells (DCs) in the spleen develop into XCR1+ DCs in the small intestine, T cell zones of Peyer's patches, and T cell zones and sinuses of mesenteric lymph nodes. XCR1+ DCs specialize in cross-presentations of orally applied antigens. The integrin SIRPα is also a differentiating factor for the XCR1+ DCs. The development transcription factor Batf3 helps develop the differences between XCR1+ DCs and CD103+ CD11b- DCs.

XCL1 contributes to chemotaxis only in CD8+ murine cells, but not other DC types, B cells, T cells, or NK cells. Only some of these CD8+ murine cells expressed XCR1 receptors. NK cells release XCL1 along with IFN-γ and some other chemokines upon encountering certain bacteria such as Listeria or MCMV. XCR1+ and CD8+cells work together to cross-present antigen and communicate CD8+ activation. Cross presentation of XCR1+ CD8+ and XCR1+ CD8- cells was strongest, as is expected since they have XCR1 receptors. CD4+ and CD8+ may become outdated terms, since the activity of the cell appears to be primarily dependent upon the expression of XCR1, which will make a population far more similar than the expression of CD4 or CD8.

XCR1+ cells are dependent on the growth factor Ftl3 ligand and are nonexistent in Batf3- deficient mice. Also, XCR1+ DCs are related to CD103+CD11b- DCs.

XCL1 is expressed by medullary thymic epithelial T cells (mTECs) while XCR1 is expressed by thymic dendritic cells (tDCs). This communication helps with the destruction of cells that are not self-tolerant. When mice lose the ability to express XCL1, they are deficient in accumulation of tDCs and producing naturally occurring regulatory T cells (nT reg cells). The displaying of XCL1 by mTECs, tDC chemotaxis, and nT reg cell production are all decreased in mice that lack Aire, demonstrating it as an important regulator of XCL1 production.

Naive CD8+ T cells are prepared when tumors form by cross-presentation via XCR1+ DCs and as a result will require a lower threshold to respond to antigen. Memory CD8+ T lymphocytes (mCTLs) are activated first after infection and then are signaled by CXCR3, IL-12, and CXCL9 by other XCR1+ DCs. In order to make a powerful secondary infection response, cytokine and chemokine signaling between XCR1+ DCs and NK cells must occur.
