= TNFRSF19 =

Protein-coding gene in the species Homo sapiens

Identifiers
- Aliases: TNFRSF19, TAJ, TAJ-alpha, TRADE, TROY, tumor necrosis factor receptor superfamily member 19, TNF receptor superfamily member 19
- External IDs: OMIM: 606122; MGI: 1352474; GeneCards: TNFRSF19

Gene location (Human)
Chr.	Chromosome 13 (human)
Band	13q12.12	Start	23,570,370 bp
Band	13q12.12	End	23,676,104 bp

Gene location (Mouse)
Chr.	Chromosome 14 (mouse)
Band	14|14 D1	Start	61,201,324 bp
Band	14|14 D1	End	61,283,939 bp
RNA expression pattern
Bgee	Human / Mouse (ortholog); Top expressed in: skin of arm; skin of thigh; bronchial epithelial cell; skin of hip; mucosa of paranasal sinus; skin of abdomen; ventricular zone; right uterine tube; trachea; olfactory zone of nasal mucosa / Top expressed in: bronchus; calvaria; molar; main bronchus; body of femur; epithelium of bronchus; maxillary prominence; skin of external ear; upper jaw; vestibular sensory epithelium; More reference expression data
BioGPS	n/a
Gene ontology
Molecular function	tumor necrosis factor-activated receptor activity; signaling receptor activity; protein binding
Cellular component	integral component of membrane; membrane; intracellular anatomical structure; plasma membrane
Biological process	hair follicle development; JNK cascade; apoptotic process; positive regulation of JNK cascade; tissue development; positive regulation of I-kappaB kinase/NF-kappaB signaling; tumor necrosis factor-mediated signaling pathway
Sources:Amigo / QuickGO
Orthologs
Databases	NCBI: entry; OMA: entry
Species	Human	Mouse
Entrez	55504	29820
Ensembl	ENSG00000127863	ENSMUSG00000060548
UniProt	Q9NS68	Q9JLL3
RefSeq (mRNA)	NM_001204458; NM_001204459; NM_018647; NM_148957; NM_001354985	NM_001164155; NM_013869
RefSeq (protein)	NP_001191387; NP_001191388; NP_061117; NP_683760; NP_001341914	NP_001157627; NP_038897
Location (UCSC)	Chr 13: 23.57 – 23.68 Mb	Chr 14: 61.2 – 61.28 Mb
PubMed search
- Wikidata
View/Edit Human	View/Edit Mouse

Tumor necrosis factor receptor superfamily, member 19, also known as TNFRSF19 and TROY, is a human gene.

The protein encoded by this gene is a member of the TNF-receptor superfamily. This receptor is highly expressed during embryonic development. It has been shown to interact with TNF receptor associated factor (TRAF) family members, and to activate c-Jun N-terminal kinases (JNK) signaling pathway when overexpressed in cells. This receptor is capable of inducing apoptosis by a caspase-independent mechanism, and it is thought to play an essential role in embryonic development. Alternatively spliced transcript variants encoding distinct isoforms have been described.

== See also ==
- Mitogen-activated protein kinase for JNK signaling pathway description
