= Immunophysics =

Immunophysics is a novel interdisciplinary research field using immunological, biological, physical and chemical approaches to elucidate and modify immune-mediated mechanisms and to expand our knowledge on the pathomechanisms of chronic immune-mediated diseases such as arthritis, inflammatory bowel disease, asthma and chronic infections.

== Background ==
Immune reactions are tightly regulated and usually self-limited. Dysregulation can result in chronic inflammatory diseases (immunochronicity). In addition to biochemical molecular mechanisms, physical factors influence the immune system. Such components include:

- Microenvironmental factors like tonicity, pH, oxygen pressure and the redox status of immune cells
- Mechanical factors, such as tissue pressure, cellular stiffness and cell motility
- Cell membrane physics such as membrane composition and particles

The research field of immunophysics aims to investigate the influence of these physicochemical parameters on the function of the immune system in health and disease.

== Methods ==
Immunophysical techniques include nuclear magnetic resonance spectroscopy, magnetic resonance imaging (MRI), dual-energy computed tomography, fluorescence-lifetime imaging microscopy, multispectral optoacoustic tomography (MSOT), high-throughput microfluidic cytometry, interferometric scattering microscopy (iSCAT) and cryogenic optical localization in 3D (COLD).

== Applications ==
Immunophysical research is considered to open new perspectives for the investigation of the pathomechanisms of immune-mediated inflammatory diseases, help to develop novel detection methods and diagnostic tools in these diseases and advance the treatment possibilities of such diseases.

== See also ==
- Inflammation
