= Anti-cholesterol =

Anti-cholesterol is a naturally occurring antibody to cholesterol produced by mammals. This antibody serves a ‘housekeeping’ or protective role for the host animal, helping to protect the animal from harmful forms of cholesterol such as LDL and VLDL.

== Modes of Action ==
An immunoglobulin protein, anti-cholesterol may be found both in circulation as well as in the digestive tract.

- In circulation, this antibody binds selectively to the small, dense, oxidized cholesterol or oxysterol rich LDLs that are known to contribute to the development of atherosclerosis. The antibody does not bind the good forms of cholesterol such as HDL.
- In the gastrointestinal tract, the antibody acts as a cholesterol absorption inhibitor. The antibody selectively binds to oxysterol or oxidized-rich cholesterol micelles and prevents their uptake by the intestinal enterocyte. The antibody-bound micelle is then removed through fecal clearance.
