= Dog leukocyte antigen =

The dog leukocyte antigen (DLA) is a part of the major histocompatibility complex (MHC) in dogs, encoding genes in the MHC. The DLA and MHC system are interchangeable terms in canines. The MHC plays a critical role in the immune response system and consists of three regions: class I, class II and class III. DLA genes belong to the first two classes, which are involved in the regulation of antigens in the immune system. The class II genes are highly polymorphic, with many different alleles/haplotypes that have been linked to diseases, allergies, and autoimmune conditions such as diabetes, polyarthritis, and hypothyroidism in canines.

There are likely hundreds of immunologically relevant genes making up the DLA region in the canine genome; as of the present date the complete characteristics of the gene is unknown. MHC genes represent candidates for disease susceptibility in canines; some alleles promote protection against immune-mediated diseases and some increase susceptibility. For example, certain combinations of the DLA-DRB1 and DQ alleles are most favorable for good immune regulation. These alleles help balance immune surveillance and immune response without increasing the risk of developing an autoimmune condition. Different canine breeds have MHC/DLA allele association; these genes exhibit more inter-breed differentiation than intra-breed differentiation. Dogs have been selectively bred for different phenotypes, so the underlying genotypes and linked regions also differ among breeds. Selection on the DLA can lead to an increase in the prevalence of immune-mediated diseases. Due to selective breeding some breeds have become restricted in their DLA genes, with a limited subset of DLA alleles occurring within the breed. This explains some of the variation in immune responses among breeds. This occurs because there is a strong linkage disequilibrium that exists between DLA class II loci. The pattern displayed by the genetic differences among human ethnic groups is analogous to the pattern displayed by the distribution of DLA types in different canine breeds. MHC genes in humans are also known to be major contributors to autoimmune condition development.

== Canine diabetes and DLA ==
In 1974 J. Nerup and others discovered that there is a link between diabetes and MHC genes. Dog leukocyte antigen has been found to be the genetic component associated with canine diabetes. The common alleles/haplotypes found in diabetes prone breeds (Samoyed, Carin Terrier, and Tibetan Terrier) are DLA DBR1*009, DQA1*001, and DQB1*008. The DLA DQA1 alleles code for an arginine amino acid at position 55 in region two, this increases the risk of developing diabetes in dog as arginine is a positive amino acid which can impair antigen binding. This allele is also associated with hypothyroidism which implies that this allele increases susceptibility for endocrinopathic immune-mediated diseases. It is possible that the link discovered between DLA associations and diabetes could be due to "makers" of susceptibility and that the true reason for susceptibility lies elsewhere in the genome. It could be associated with particular DLA alleles/haplotypes or caused by the strong linkage disequilibrium.
