= IFITM3 =

Protein-coding gene in the species Homo sapiens

Identifiers
- Aliases: IFITM3, 1-8U, DSPA2b, IP15, interferon induced transmembrane protein 3
- External IDs: OMIM: 605579; MGI: 1913391; GeneCards: IFITM3

Gene location (Human)
Chr.	Chromosome 11 (human)
Band	11p15.5	Start	319,676 bp
Band	11p15.5	End	329,475 bp

Gene location (Mouse)
Chr.	Chromosome 7 (mouse)
Band	7|7 F5	Start	140,589,499 bp
Band	7|7 F5	End	140,590,683 bp
RNA expression pattern
Bgee	Human / Mouse (ortholog); Top expressed in: left uterine tube; Descending thoracic aorta; left coronary artery; pericardium; ascending aorta; upper lobe of left lung; right coronary artery; canal of the cervix; right lung; body of uterus / Top expressed in: aortic valve; right lung lobe; carotid body; granulocyte; uterus; ascending aorta; cervix; left lobe of liver; calvaria; ankle joint; More reference expression data
BioGPS	n/a
Gene ontology
Molecular function	protein binding
Cellular component	integral component of membrane; endosome; membrane; late endosome membrane; plasma membrane; lysosomal membrane; lysosome; protein-containing complex
Biological process	negative regulation of viral entry into host cell; response to interferon-gamma; immune system process; response to virus; response to interferon-beta; response to biotic stimulus; negative regulation of viral genome replication; type I interferon signaling pathway; immune response; response to interferon-alpha; innate immune response; negative regulation of viral transcription; defense response to virus
Sources:Amigo / QuickGO
Orthologs
Databases	NCBI: entry; OMA: entry
Species	Human	Mouse
Entrez	10410	66141
Ensembl	ENSG00000142089	ENSMUSG00000025492
UniProt	Q01628	Q9CQW9
RefSeq (mRNA)	NM_021034	NM_025378
RefSeq (protein)	NP_066362	NP_079654
Location (UCSC)	Chr 11: 0.32 – 0.33 Mb	Chr 7: 140.59 – 140.59 Mb
PubMed search
- Wikidata
View/Edit Human	View/Edit Mouse

Interferon-induced transmembrane protein 3 (IFITM3) is a protein that in humans is encoded by the IFITM3 gene. It plays a critical role in the immune system's defense against swine flu, where heightened levels of IFITM3 keep viral levels low, and the removal of IFITM3 allows the virus to multiply unchecked.

This observation has been further advanced by a recent study from Paul Kellam's lab that shows that a single nucleotide polymorphism in the human IFITM3 gene purported to increase influenza susceptibility is overrepresented in people hospitalised with pandemic H1N1. The prevalence of this mutation is thought to be approximately 1/400 in European populations.
