= Interferon-induced transmembrane protein 2 =

Protein-coding gene in the species Homo sapiens

IFITM2

Identifiers
- Aliases: IFITM2, 1-8D, DSPA2c, interferon induced transmembrane protein 2
- External IDs: OMIM: 605578; MGI: 1933382; GeneCards: IFITM2

Gene location (Human)
Chr.	Chromosome 11 (human)
Band	11p15.5	Start	303,655 bp
Band	11p15.5	End	309,397 bp

Gene location (Mouse)
Chr.	Chromosome 7 (mouse)
Band	7|7 F5	Start	140,534,750 bp
Band	7|7 F5	End	140,535,900 bp
RNA expression pattern
Bgee	Human / Mouse (ortholog); Top expressed in: blood; right lung; pericardium; periodontal fiber; spleen; upper lobe of left lung; left uterine tube; Descending thoracic aorta; olfactory bulb; granulocyte / Top expressed in: adrenal gland; granulocyte; uterus; lung; urinary bladder; lip; white adipose tissue; zone of skin; heart; epiblast; More reference expression data
BioGPS	n/a
Orthologs
Databases	NCBI: entry; OMA: entry
Species	Human	Mouse
Entrez	10581	80876
Ensembl	ENSG00000185201	ENSMUSG00000060591
UniProt	Q01629	Q99J93
RefSeq (mRNA)	NM_006435	NM_030694
RefSeq (protein)	NP_006426	NP_109619
Location (UCSC)	Chr 11: 0.3 – 0.31 Mb	Chr 7: 140.53 – 140.54 Mb
PubMed search
- Wikidata
View/Edit Human	View/Edit Mouse

Interferon-induced transmembrane protein 2 is a protein that in humans is encoded by the IFITM2 gene. IFITM1 is a member of the IFITM family (Interferon-induced transmembrane protein) which is encoded by IFITM genes.

As the name implies, these genes are induced by interferon and form part of its signaling pathway. In the absence of interferon stimulation, IFITM proteins can express broadly in tissues and cell lines. In humans, IFITM1, IFITM2 and IFITM3 are able to express in different tissues and cells while the expression of IFITM5 is limited to osteoblasts.

== Antiviral function ==
IFITM proteins have been identified as antiviral restriction factors that block the early stages of viral replication. They inhibit influenza A virus replication, and infection with a wide range of other enveloped viruses
