= Colony-stimulating factor =

Family of proteins

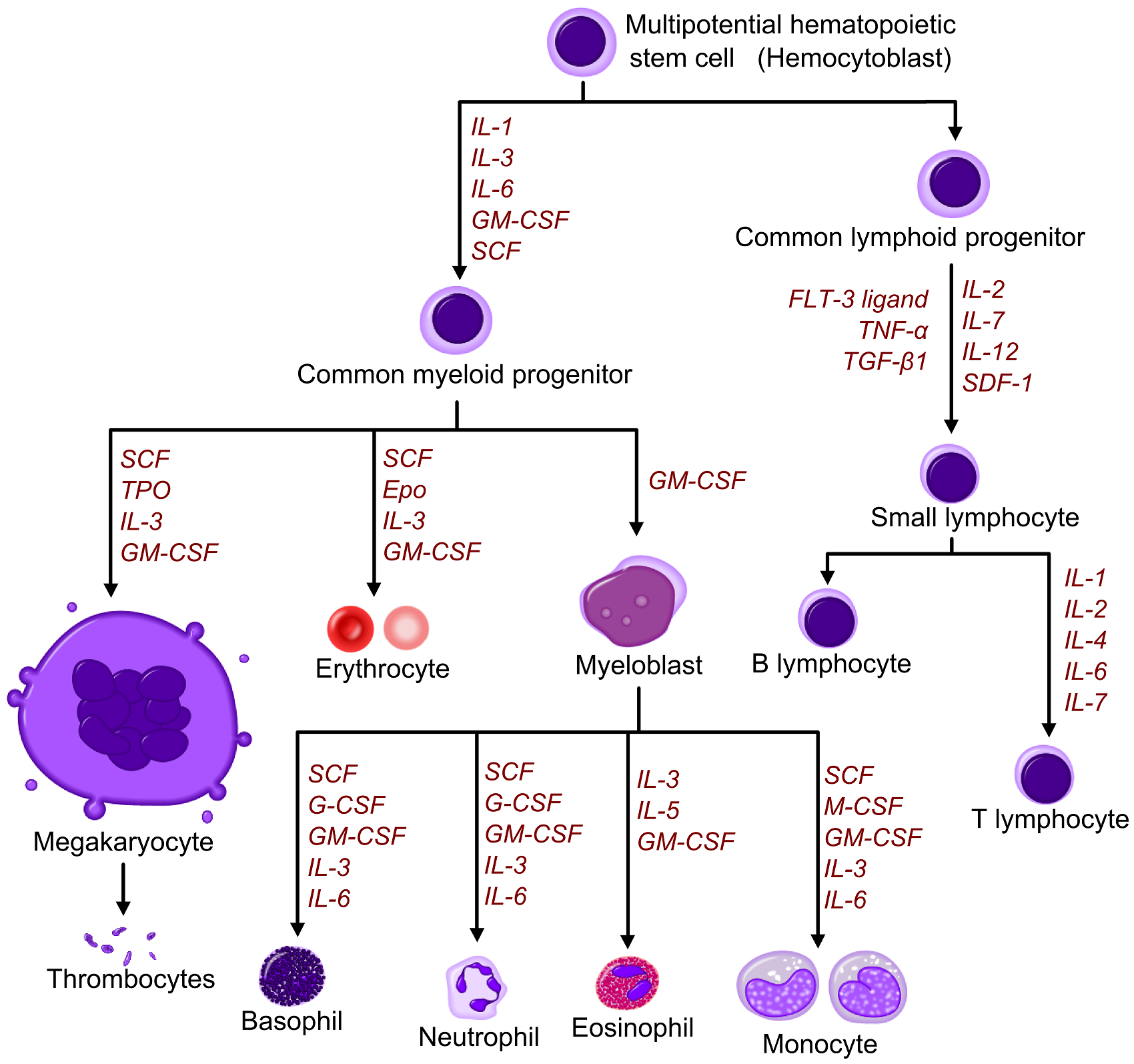
A diagram of different blood cell types, and what types of cell they differentiate from

Colony-stimulating factors (CSFs) are secreted glycoproteins that bind to receptor proteins on the surfaces of committed progenitors in the bone marrow, thereby activating intracellular signaling pathways that can cause the cells to proliferate and differentiate into a specific kind of blood cell (usually white blood cells. For red blood cell formation, see erythropoietin).

They may be synthesized and administered exogenously. However, such molecules can at a latter stage be detected, since they differ slightly from the endogenous ones in, e.g., features of post-translational modification.

== Etymology ==
The name "colony-stimulating factors" comes from the method by which they were discovered.

Hematopoietic stem cells were cultured (see cell culture) on a so-called semisolid matrix, which prevents cells from moving around, so that, if a single cell starts proliferating, all of the cells derived from it will remain clustered around the spot in the matrix where the first cell was originally located. These are referred to as "colonies". Therefore, it was possible to add various substances to cultures of hemopoietic stem cells and then examine which kinds of colonies (if any) were "stimulated" by them.

The substance that was found to stimulate formation of colonies of macrophages, for instance, was called macrophage colony-stimulating factor, for granulocytes, granulocyte colony-stimulating factor, and so on.

== Mechanism ==
The colony-stimulating factors are soluble (permeable), in contrast to other, membrane-bound substances of the hematopoietic microenvironment. This is sometimes used as the definition of CSFs. They transduce by paracrine, endocrine, or autocrine signaling.

== Examples ==
Colony-stimulating factors include:

- CSF1 – macrophage colony-stimulating factor
- CSF2 – Granulocyte macrophage colony-stimulating factors (also called GM-CSF and sargramostim)
- CSF3 – Granulocyte colony-stimulating factors (also called G-CSF and filgrastim)
- Interleukin 3
- Synthetic – Promegapoietin

== Clinical uses ==
- Bone marrow stimulation
- Stem cell mobilization
