= Cancer immunoprevention =

Prevention of cancer onset with immunological means

Cancer immunoprevention is the prevention of cancer onset with immunological means such as vaccines, immunostimulators or antibodies. Cancer immunoprevention is conceptually different from cancer immunotherapy, which aims at stimulating immunity in patients only after tumor onset, however the same immunological means can be used both in immunoprevention and in immunotherapy.

== Immunoprevention of tumors caused by viruses ==
Immunoprevention of tumors caused by viruses or other infectious agents aims at preventing or curing infection before the onset of cancer. Effective vaccines are available for use in humans.
Some tumor types in humans and in animals are the consequence of viral infections. In humans the most frequent viral tumors are liver cancer (also called hepatocellular carcinoma), arising in a small proportion of patients with chronic infection by hepatitis B virus (HBV) or hepatitis C virus (HCV), and carcinoma of the uterine cervix (also called cervical cancer), caused by human papilloma virus (HPV). Altogether these two tumors make 10% of all human cancers, affecting almost one million new patients each year worldwide. The HBV vaccine, now in worldwide use, was shown to reduce the incidence of liver carcinoma. Cancer immunoprevention by the HBV vaccine can be thought of as a beneficial side effect of vaccine developed and used to prevent hepatitis B. This is not the case with HPV vaccines, which were primarily developed for cancer prevention. Clinical trials showed that HPV vaccines can prevent HPV infection and carcinogenesis almost completely; these results led to vaccine approval by regulatory agencies in USA and Europe.

== Immunoprevention of non-infectious tumors ==
Is it possible to devise immunopreventive strategies for tumors not caused by infectious agents? The challenge is to predict in each individual the risk of specific cancer types and to design immune strategies targeting these cancer types. This is not yet feasible in humans, thus immunoprevention of non-infectious tumors is at a preclinical stage of development.
Effective immunoprevention of various types of cancer was obtained in murine models of cancer risk, in particular in transgenic mice harboring activated oncogenes, thus demonstrating that activation of the immune system in healthy hosts can indeed prevent carcinogenesis. Both non-specific immune stimuli, like cytokines and other immunostimulators, and vaccines containing a specific antigen were active in mouse models; combinations of both types of agents yielded the best results, up to an almost complete, long-term block of carcinogenesis in models of aggressive cancer development.

=== Clinical development and risks ===
The success of cancer immunoprevention in preclinical models suggests that it might have an impact also in humans. The main problems to be solved are the definition of appropriate human applications and of the risks for human health.
Application to the general population, as is being done for vaccines against HBV and HPV, is currently unfeasible, because it would require a precise individual prediction of the risk of cancer. Subgroups at high risk of developing a defined type of tumor, for example families with hereditary cancer or individuals with preneoplastic lesions, are the natural candidates for immunoprevention of non-infectious tumors. It has also been suggested that immunopreventive strategies can have therapeutic effects against metastases, hence early human trials could aim at cancer therapy rather than prevention.
The main risk of prolonged immune stimulation for cancer prevention is the development of autoimmune diseases. Most antitumor immune responses are autoimmune, because most tumor antigens are also expressed by normal cells, but it must be considered that autoimmune responses do not necessarily evolve into autoimmune diseases. The limited autoimmunity triggered by cancer immunoprevention did not cause overt autoimmune diseases in preclinical mouse studies, however this is an issue that will require careful monitoring in early clinical trials.
