= Isoantibodies =

Isoantibodies, formerly called alloantibodies, are antibodies produced by an individual against isoantigens produced by members of the same species. In the case of the species Homo sapiens, for example, there are a significant number of antigens that are different in every individual. When antigens from another individual are introduced into another's body, these isoantibodies immediately bind to and destroy them.

One common example is the isohaemagglutinins, which are responsible for blood transfusion reactions. This may subjectively differ from the term 'natural' antibodies, or simply 'antibodies', as the former seem to arise from genetic control without apparent antigenic stimulation whereas the latter arise due to antigenic stimulation.

== Isoantigens ==
A protein or other substance, such as histocompatibility or red blood cell antigens, that is present in only some members of a species and therefore able to stimulate isoantibody production in other members of the same species who lack it. When injected into another animal, they trigger an immune response aimed at eliminating them. Therefore, it can be thought of as an antigen that is present in some members of the same species, but is not common to all members of that species. If an alloantigen is presented to a member of the same species that does not have the alloantigen, it will be recognized as foreign. They are the products of polymorphic genes.

== Production of isohaemagglutinins ==
Isoantibodies are seen in people with different blood groups. The anti-A or anti-B isoantibodies or both (also called isohaemagglutinins) are produced by an individual against the antigens (A or B) on the RBCs of other blood groups. In a person with A blood group, the plasma will contain isoantibodies against B antigens, so immediately after transfusion of blood from B group the anti-B isohemagglutinins agglutinate the foreign red blood cells.

Anti-A and anti-B antibodies (called isohaemagglutinins), which are not present in human babies, appear in the first years of life.

It is possible that food and environmental antigens (bacterial, viral or plant antigens) have epitopes similar enough to A and B glycoprotein antigens. The antibodies created against these environmental antigens in the first years of life can cross react with ABO-incompatible red blood cells when it comes in contact with during blood transfusion later in life. Anti-A and anti-B antibodies are usually IgM type. O-type individuals can produce IgG-type ABO antibodies.

== See also ==
- ABO blood group system
- Alloimmunity
- Antibodies
