= PGG-glucan =

Immunomodulator

Poly-[1-6]--D-glucopyranosyl-[1-3]--D-glucopyranose glucan (PGG glucan, proprietary name Betafectin) is an anti-infective agent and a form or type of beta-glucan.

Betafectin is a PGG-glucan, a novel β-(1,6) branched β-(1,3) glucan, purified from the cell walls of Saccharomyces cerevisiae.

It is a macrophage-specific immunomodulator.
