= Role of microglia in disease =

Microglia are the primary immune cells of the central nervous system, similar to peripheral macrophages. They respond to pathogens and injury by changing morphology and migrating to the site of infection/injury, where they destroy pathogens and remove damaged cells.

As part of their response they secrete cytokines, chemokines, prostaglandins, and reactive oxygen species, which help to direct the immune response. Additionally, they are instrumental in the resolution of the inflammatory response, through the production of anti-inflammatory cytokines. Microglia have also been extensively studied for their harmful roles in neurodegenerative diseases, such as Alzheimer's disease, Parkinson's disease, multiple sclerosis, as well as cardiac diseases, glaucoma, and viral and bacterial infections. Significant microglia activation has also been found in individuals with autism; the Injury pathway in PVL also involves glial cells.

== Role in chronic neuroinflammation ==
The word neuroinflammation has come to stand for chronic, central nervous system (CNS) specific, inflammation-like glial responses that may produce neurodegenerative symptoms such as plaque formation, dystrophic neurite growth, and excessive tau phosphorylation. It is important to distinguish between acute and chronic neuroinflammation. Acute neuroinflammation is generally caused by some neuronal injury after which microglia migrate to the injured site engulfing dead cells and debris. The term neuroinflammation generally refers to more chronic, sustained injury when the responses of microglial cells contribute to and expand the neurodestructive effects, worsening the disease process.

When microglia are activated they take on an amoeboid shape and they alter their gene expression. Altered gene expression leads to the production of numerous potentially neurotoxic mediators. These mediators are important in the normal functions of microglia and their production is usually decreased once their task is complete. In chronic neuroinflammation, microglia remain activated for an extended period during which the production of mediators is sustained longer than usual. This increase in mediators contributes to neuronal death.

Neuroinflammation is distinct from inflammation in other organs, but does include some similar mechanisms such as the localized production of chemoattractant molecules to the site of inflammation. The following list contains a few of the numerous substances that are secreted when microglia are activated:

=== Cytokines ===
Microglia activate the proinflammatory cytokines IFN-γ, IL-1α, IL-1β and TNF-α in the CNS. Direct injection of the cytokines IL-1α, IL-1β and TNF-α into the CNS result in local inflammatory responses and neuronal degradation. Cytokines play a potential role in neurodegeneration when microglia remain in a sustained activated state. This is in contrast with the potential neurotrophic (inducing growth of neurons) actions of these cytokines during acute neuroinflammation. Pro- and anti-inflammatory cytokines contribute differently to the neuroinflammatory process after acute brain injury.

=== Chemokines ===
Chemokines are cytokines that stimulate directional migration of inflammatory cells in vitro and in vivo. Chemokines are divided into four main subfamilies: C, CC, CXC, and CX_{3}C. Microglial cells are sources of some chemokines and express the monocyte chemoattractant protein-1 (MCP-1) chemokine in particular. Other inflammatory cytokines like IL-1β and TNF-α, as well as bacterial-derived lipopolysaccharide (LPS) may stimulate microglia to produce MCP-1, MIP-1α, and MIP-1β. Microglia can express CCR3, CCR5, CXCL8, CXCR4, and CX3CR1 in vitro. Chemokines are proinflammatory and therefore contribute to the neuroinflammation process.

=== Proteases ===
When microglia are activated they induce the synthesis and secretion of proteolytic enzymes that are potentially involved in many functions. There are a number of proteases that possess the potential to degrade both the extracellular matrix and neuronal cells that are in the neighborhood of the microglia releasing these compounds. These proteases include; cathepsins B, L, and S, the matrix metalloproteinases MMP-1, MMP-2, MMP-3, and MMP-9, and the metalloprotease-disintegrin ADAM8 (plasminogen) which forms outside microglia and degrades the extracellular matrix. Both Cathepsin B, MMP-1 and MMP-3 have been found to be increased in Alzheimer's disease (AD) and cathepsin B is increased in multiple sclerosis (MS). Elastase, another protease, could have large negative effects on the extracellular matrix.

=== Amyloid precursor protein ===
Microglia synthesize amyloid precursor protein (APP) in response to excitotoxic injury. Plaques result from abnormal proteolytic cleavage of membrane bound APP. Amyloid plaques can stimulate microglia to produce neurotoxic compounds such as cytokines, excitotoxin, nitric oxide and lipophylic amines, which all cause neural damage. Plaques in Alzheimer's disease contain activated microglia. A study has shown that direct injection of amyloid into brain tissue activates microglia, which reduces the number of neurons. Microglia have also been suggested as a possible source of secreted β amyloid.

== Role in neurodegeneration ==
Microglia also have a role in neurodegenerative disorders, which are characterized by progressive cell loss in specific neuronal populations. "Many of the normal trophic functions of glia may be lost or overwhelmed when the cells become chronically activated in progressive neurodegenerative disorders, for there is abundant evidence that in such disorders, activated glia play destructive roles by direct and indirect inflammatory attack." The following are prominent examples of microglial cells' role in neurodegenerative disorders.

=== Alzheimer's disease ===
Alzheimer's disease (AD) is a progressive, neurodegenerative disease where the brain develops abnormal clumps (amyloid plaques) and tangled fiber bundles (neurofibrillary tangles).

==== Genetics ====
Many genes associated with Alzheimer's disease risk are highly expressed in microglia. In late-onset (non-familial) Alzheimer's disease, a common variant of SPI1 expression is implicated in Alzheimer's risk. It encodes PU.1, a transcription factor necessary for microglial development. TREM2, a cell surface receptor on microglia, is associated with Alzheimer's as well, notably interacting with Apolipoprotein E (another Alzheimer's disease risk factor).

==== Microglia activity ====
There are many activated microglia over-expressing IL-1 in the brains of Alzheimer patients that are distributed with both Aβ plaques and neurofibrillary tangles. This over expression of IL-1 leads to excessive tau phosphorylation that is related to tangle development in Alzheimer's disease.

Many activated microglia are found to be associated with amyloid deposits in the brains of Alzheimer's patients. Microglia interact with β-amyloid plaques through cell surface receptors that are linked to tyrosine kinase based signaling cascades that induce inflammation. When microglia interact with the deposited fibrillar forms of β-amyloid it leads to the conversion of the microglia into an activated cell and results in the synthesis and secretion of cytokines and other proteins that are neurotoxic.

One preliminary model as to how this would occur involves a positive feedback loop. When activated, microglia will secrete proteases, cytokines, and reactive oxygen species. The cytokines may induce neighboring cells to synthesize amyloid precursor protein. The proteases then possibly could cause the cleaving required to turn precursor molecules into the beta amyloid that characterizes the disease. Then, the oxygen species encourage the aggregation of beta amyloid in order to form plaques. The growing size of these plaques then in turn triggers the action of even more microglia, which then secrete more cytokines, proteases, and oxygen species, thus amplifying the neurodegeneration.

==== Treatment ====
Non-steroidal anti-inflammatory drugs (NSAIDs) have proven to be effective in reducing the risk of AD. "Sustained treatment with NSAIDs lowers the risk of AD by 55%, delays disease onset, attenuates symptomatic severity and slows the loss of cognitive abilities. The main cellular target for NSAIDs is thought to be microglia. This is supported by the fact that in patients taking NSAIDs the number of activated microglia is decreased by 65%."

Based on observational studies and randomized controlled trials, NSAID use is not effective for the treatment or prevention of Alzheimer's disease.

=== Parkinson's disease ===
Parkinson's disease is a movement disorder in which the dopamine-producing neurons in the brain do not function as they should; the neurons of the substantia nigra become dysfunctional and eventually die, leaving a lack of dopamine input into the striatum. Glial cell line-derived neurotrophic factor (GDNF) may have the ability to chemoprotect the cells of the substantia nigra. A small study is (2017) in the recruitment stage for participants who will undergo AAV2-GDNF gene transfer via surgical infusion into their brains, in the hope of ameliorating Parkinson's symptoms.

=== Multiple sclerosis ===
Multiple sclerosis (MS) is a chronic inflammatory and neurodegenerative disease of the central nervous system (CNS) characterized by focal lesions of inflammation, axonal loss, gliosis, and demyelination that affect the white and gray matter. In MS patients, destruction of myelin in the CNS is associated with activated macrophages or microglia, which are thought to be involved in the disease pathogenesis.

While most of the findings of microglial activation are non-MS specific, the M1 activation (CD40, CD86) is specific for this disease.

=== Cardiovascular diseases ===
Recently microglial activation has been reported in rats with myocardial infarction (Rana et al., 2010). This activation was specific to brain nuclei involved in cardiovascular regulation suggesting possible role of microglial activation in progression to heart failure.

== Role in glaucoma ==
Several studies have proved the changes occurring in the microglia of the inner plexiform and of the outer plexiform layers of the retina. Also a new software to automatize the count of microglial cells in the retina has been published. However, depletion of microglia from the retina and optic nerve does not affect the degeneration process of retinal ganglion cells after acute injury of the optic nerve. Thus, it remains to be studied whether microglia play a functional role in the degeneration process in glaucoma.

== Role in glioma ==
Gliomas are complex brain tumors composed of heterogeneous populations of neoplastic as well as non-neoplastic cells. Not only tumor cells, but also non-tumor cells of the microenvironment contribute to cancer progression and response to treatment. Tumor-associated macrophages/microglia (TAMs) are the main infiltrate in gliomas, comprising up to 40% of the tumor mass. TAMs are either of peripheral origin (macrophages) or representing brain-intrinsic, yolk sac-derived microglia, that create a supportive stroma for neoplastic cell expansion and invasion. Crosstalk between tumor cells and TAMs is characterized by the release of growth factors and cytokines by TAMs in response to factors produced by cancer cells. In this manner, TAMs facilitate tumor proliferation, survival and migration. Microglial TAMs are mainly found in the tumor margin, while macrophage TAMs are found in the tumor core and in regions of necrosis. Blood-derived TAMs upregulate immunosuppressive cytokines and show an altered metabolism compared to microglial TAMs. Therefore, high degrees of infiltration with blood-derived TAMs, but not microglial TAMs, correlates with significantly inferior survival in low-grade glioma.

== Role in viral infections ==
=== Human immunodeficiency virus ===
The infection of mononuclear phagocytes with HIV-1 is an important element in the development of HIV-associated dementia complex (HAD). The only brain cell type that is "productively" infected with the virus are microglial cells. It has also become clear that neurotoxic mediators released from brain microglia play an important role in the pathogenesis of HIV-1.

"HIV-1 can enter the microglial cell via CD4 receptors and chemokine co-receptors such as CCR3, CCR5, and CXCR4, with CCR5 being the most important of these. Humans with double allelic loss of CCR5 are virtually immune to HIV acquired via the sexual route (though can be infected by IV transmission of CXCR4 tropic viruses). IL-4 and IL-10 enhance the entry and replication of HIV-1 in microglia through the up-regulation of CD4 and CCR5 expression, respectively. The chemokines CCL5/RANTES, CCL3/MIP-1α, CCL4/MIP-1β, all of which bind to CCR5, are inhibitory to HIV-1 replication in microglial cells, apparently by their ability to block viral entry."

Infected microglia contain viral particles intracellularly. There is a correlation between the severity of dementia and microglial production of neurotoxins.

One discrepancy in HAD is the limited number of HIV-1 infected microglia in comparison to the many CNS abnormalities that occur. This suggests that chemical factors that are released from microglial cells are contributing to neuronal loss. "It has become more and more apparent that HIV-1 infected microglial cells actively secrete both endogenous neurotoxins such as TNF-α, IL-1β, CXCL8/IL-8, glutamate, quinolinic acid, platelet activating factor, eicosanoids, and NO as well as the neurotoxic viral proteins Tat, gp120, and gp41."

Microglia are the main target of HIV-1 in the brain. When activated by HIV-1 or viral proteins, they secrete or induce other cells to secrete neurotoxic factors; this process is accompanied by neuronal dysfunction (HAD).

=== Herpes simplex virus ===
Herpes simplex virus (HSV) can cause herpes encephalitis in babies and immunocompetent adults. Studies have shown that long-term neuroimmune activation persists after the herpes infection in patients. Microglia produce cytokines that are toxic to neurons; this may be a mechanism underlying HSV-related CNS damage. It has been found that "active microglial cells in HSV encephalitis patients do persist for more than 12 months after antiviral treatment."

== Role in bacterial infections ==
Lipopolysaccharide (LPS) is the major component of the outer membrane of a gram-negative bacterial cell wall. LPS has been shown to activate microglia in vitro and stimulates microglia to produce cytokines, chemokines, and prostaglandins. "Although LPS has been used as a classic activating agent, a recent study of rat microglia demonstrated that prolonged LPS exposure induces a distinctly different activated state from that in microglia acutely exposed to LPS."

=== Streptococcus pneumoniae ===
Streptococcus pneumoniae is the most common cause of bacterial meningitis. It is primarily localized to the subarachnoid space while cytokines and chemokines are produced inside the blood–brain barrier. Microglia interact with streptococcus via their TLR2 receptor; this interaction then activates microglia to produce nitric oxide which is neurotoxic. The inflammatory response, triggered by microglia, may cause intracerebral edema.

== Role in parasitic infections ==
=== Plasmodium falciparum ===
Plasmodium falciparum is a parasite that causes malaria in humans. A serious complication of malaria is cerebral malaria (CM). CM occurs when red blood cells break through the blood–brain barrier, causing microhemorrhages, ischemia and glial cell growth. This can lead to microglial aggregates called Durck's granulomas. Recent research has indicated that microglia play a major role in the pathogenesis of CM.

=== Trichobilharzia regenti ===
Trichobilharzia regenti is a neuropathogenic schistosome which migrates in a central nervous system of birds and mammals. In mice, microglia accumulate in the parasite migratory tracks and around damaged or dying worms. In vitro, microglia produce nitric oxide and proinflammatory cytokines IL-6 and TNF-alpha after exposure to parasite antigens, which suggests their role both in maintaining inflammation and tissue pathology.

== Role in neuropathic pain ==
Microglia have been implicated in neuropathic pain. They become activated in response to nerve injury, as demonstrated by several animal models. Activated microglia release substances that excite pain-sensitive neurons, including prostaglandins and reactive oxygen species, through the purinergic signaling mechanisms. Moreover, microglia also release of proinflammatory molecules through the stimulation of purinergic receptors, including IL1-β, IL-6, and TNF-α. The release of these molecules is mediated by the P2X_{7} receptor and creates a positive feedback loop, exacerbating the pain response.

A causal role for microglia in the pathogenesis of neuropathic pain has been demonstrated through P2X_{4} receptor. P2X_{4} receptors are upregulated following injury and the increase in purinergic signaling activates p38-mitogen-activated protein kinase (p38 MAPK). The increase in p38 MAPK signaling leads to greater microglial release of brain-derived neurotrophic factor (BDNF). BDNF released from microglia induces neuronal hyperexcitability through interaction with the TrkB receptor.

Therapeutic development has focused on finding purinergic signaling blockers. There has been some success with P2X_{7} blockers, A-438079 and A-740003, however there are no selective P2X_{4} receptor antagonists to date.

== As a target to treat neuroinflammation ==
=== Inhibition of activation ===
The retina is helpful to control neuroinflammation is to inhibit microglial activation. Studies on microglia have shown that they are activated by diverse stimuli but they are dependent on activation of mitogen-activated protein kinase (MAPK). Previous approaches to down-regulate activated microglia focused on immunosuppressants. Recently, minocycline (a tetracycline derivative) has shown down-regulation of microglial MAPK. Another promising treatment is CPI-1189, which induces cell death in a TNF α-inhibiting compound that also down-regulates MAPK. Recent study shows that nicergoline (Sermion) suppresses the production of proinflammatory cytokines and superoxide anion by activated microglia. Microglial activation can be inhibited by MIF (microglia/macrophage inhibitory factor, tuftsin fragment 1–3, Thr-Lys-Pro). MIF-treated mice showed reduced brain injury and improved neurologic function in a mouse model of collagenase-induced intracerebral hemorrhage.

=== Regulation of chemokine receptor ===
The chemokine receptor, CX3CR1, is expressed by microglia in the central nervous system. Fractalkine (CX3CL1) is the exclusive ligand for CX3CR1 and is made as a transmembrane glycoprotein from which a chemokine can be released. Cardona, et al. stated in 2006 that "using three different in vivo models, we show that CX3CR1 deficiency dysregulates microglial responses, resulting in neurotoxicity." Further studies into how CX3CR1 regulates microglial neurotoxicity could lead to new therapeutic strategies for neuroprotection.

=== Inhibition of amyloid deposition ===
Inhibitors of amyloid deposition include the enzymes responsible for the production of extracellular amyloid such as β-secretase and γ-secretase inhibitors. Currently the γ-secretase inhibitors are in phase II clinical trials as a treatment for Alzheimer's disease but they have immunosuppressive properties, which could limit their use. Another strategy involves increasing the antibodies against a fragment of amyloid. This treatment is also in phase II clinical trials for the treatment of Alzheimer's disease.

=== Inhibition of cytokine synthesis ===
Glucocorticosteroids (GCS) are anti-inflammatory steroids that inhibit both central and peripheral cytokine synthesis and action. In a study conducted by Kalipada Pahan from the Department of Pediatrics at the Medical University of South Carolina, both lovastatin and sodium phenylacetate were found to inhibit TNF-α, IL-1β, and IL-6 in rat microglia. This shows that the mevalonate pathway plays a role in controlling the expression of cytokines in microglia and may be important in developing drugs to treat neurodegenerative diseases. Naltrexone may provide a solution to the inflammatory mediators produced by microglia. Although naltrexone's main action is to competitively bind to opioid receptors, new research shows that naltrexone, when given in low doses once per day (low-dose naltrexone), can inhibit cytokine synthesis by microglia cells. This mechanism is still being investigated, but there are already studies that indicate that it helps some patients suffering from fibromyalgia syndrome. Naltrexone shows more promise than GCSs because the GCSs inhibit immune system function more generally, increase allergic reactions and, as the name implies, increase blood glucose levels.
