= CCL17 =

Mammalian protein found in humans

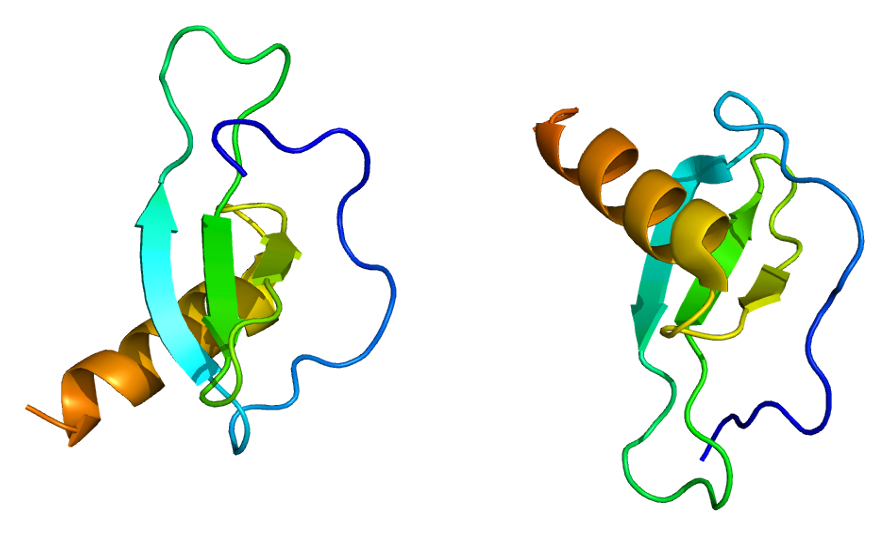

Identifiers
- Aliases: CCL17, A-152E5.3, ABCD-2, SCYA17, TARC, C-C motif chemokine ligand 17
- External IDs: OMIM: 601520; MGI: 1329039; GeneCards: CCL17
Available structures
PDB	Human UniProt search: PDBe RCSB
PDB	List of PDB id codes 1NR2, 1NR4

Gene location (Human)
Chr.	Chromosome 16 (human)
Band	16q21	Start	57,404,767 bp
Band	16q21	End	57,416,063 bp

Gene location (Mouse)
Chr.	Chromosome 8 (mouse)
Band	8 C5|8 46.85 cM	Start	95,537,081 bp
Band	8 C5|8 46.85 cM	End	95,538,664 bp
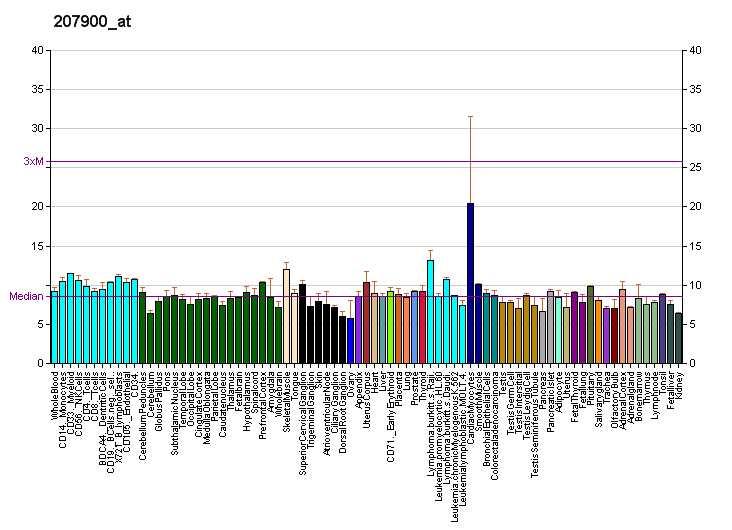
RNA expression pattern
Bgee	Human / Mouse (ortholog); Top expressed in: testicle; appendix; lymph node; olfactory zone of nasal mucosa; upper lobe of left lung; gallbladder; minor salivary glands; rectum; bronchial epithelial cell; skin of abdomen / Top expressed in: embryo; morula; Gonadal ridge; facial motor nucleus; lip; blastocyst; superior frontal gyrus; thymus; Sertoli cell; visual cortex; More reference expression data
BioGPS	More reference expression data
Gene ontology
Molecular function	cytokine activity; CCR chemokine receptor binding; signaling receptor binding; chemokine activity; CCR4 chemokine receptor binding; protein binding
Cellular component	extracellular region; extracellular space
Biological process	G protein-coupled receptor signaling pathway; negative regulation of myoblast differentiation; monocyte chemotaxis; chemokine-mediated signaling pathway; cellular response to tumor necrosis factor; cell-cell signaling; neutrophil chemotaxis; multicellular organism development; chemotaxis; positive regulation of GTPase activity; cellular response to interleukin-1; immune response; positive regulation of ERK1 and ERK2 cascade; cellular response to interferon-gamma; lymphocyte chemotaxis; inflammatory response; antimicrobial humoral immune response mediated by antimicrobial peptide; regulation of signaling receptor activity
Sources:Amigo / QuickGO
Orthologs
Databases	NCBI: entry; OMA: entry
Species	Human	Mouse
Entrez	6361	20295
Ensembl	ENSG00000102970	ENSMUSG00000031780
UniProt	Q92583	n/a
RefSeq (mRNA)	NM_002987	NM_011332
RefSeq (protein)	NP_002978	n/a
Location (UCSC)	Chr 16: 57.4 – 57.42 Mb	Chr 8: 95.54 – 95.54 Mb
PubMed search
- Wikidata
View/Edit Human	View/Edit Mouse

CCL17 is a powerful chemokine produced in the thymus and by antigen-presenting cells like dendritic cells, macrophages, and monocytes. CCL17 plays a complex role in cancer. It attracts T-regulatory cells allowing for some cancers to evade an immune response. However, in other cancers, such as melanoma, an increase in CCL17 is linked to an improved outcome. CCL17 has also been linked to autoimmune and allergic diseases.

== Classification ==
CCL17 (CC chemokine ligand 17) was initially named TARC (thymus- and activation-regulated chemokine) when first isolated in 1996. It was later renamed CCL17 as the naming conventions for all cytokines were updated to standardize names.

== Function ==
Cytokines, like CCL17, help cells communicate with one another, and stimulate cell movement. Chemokines are a type of cytokine that attract white blood cells to sites of inflammation or disease. CCL17 as well as its partner chemokine CCL22 induce chemotaxis in T-helper cells. They do this by binding to CCR4, a chemokine receptor expressed on type 2 helper T cells, cutaneous lymphocyte skin-localizing T cells, and regulatory T cells. CCR4 is also expressed by T cells involved in adult T-cell leukemia/lymphoma and cutaneous T cell lymphomas, making its ligands (namely CCL17) an attractive target for novel therapies as described below. CCL17 is one of the few chemokines that are not stored in the body, except in the thymus; these chemokines are made when needed by dendritic cells, macrophages, and monocytes. CCL17 is expressed constitutively in the thymus, but only transiently in phytohemagglutinin-stimulated peripheral blood mononuclear cells. CCL17 can also be detected in other tissues such as the colon, small intestine, and lung. Granulocyte-macrophage colony-stimulating factor (GM-CSF) upregulates CCL17 production in monocytes and macrophages. Dendritic cells will produce large quantities of CCL17 when stimulated with IL-4 or TSLP.

CCL17 was the first CC chemokine identified that interacted with T cells with high affinity. CCL17 was also found to interact with monocytes, but with less affinity. It does not interact with granulocytes. It acts as a powerful chemoattractant to T-helper cells and T-regulatory cells because both can express CCR4.

== Cancer ==
=== Classic Hodgkin lymphoma ===
CCL17 was found to be highly expressed by the tumor cells of classic Hodgkin lymphoma. It can be detected by immunohistochemistry in >90% of cases in a diagnostic setting and is highly specific within B cell derived cancers. CCL17 is mainly responsible for the presence of large amounts of T-helper and T-regulatory cells in the tumor microenvironment, which is considered a hallmark of Hodgkin lymphoma. Levels of CCL17 in serum are ~400 times higher in Hodgkin lymphoma patients than in healthy controls and are strongly associated with tumor volume, disease stage, and response to therapy. Its levels are increasing already several years prior to symptoms and diagnosis in many Hodgkin lymphoma patients.

=== Solid cancers ===
This chemokine is very important in the human body’s response to cancers. While it sometimes allows cancer to invade more rapidly, it more often helps the human body fight cancer. Some cancers that form tumors, such as breast cancer, produce CCL17 which draws T regulatory cells into the area, enhancing the cancer’s ability to invade. On the other hand, CCL17 will also activate tumor-infiltrating lymphocytes tumors. For many cancers, the more CCL17 in the area, the better the prognosis is for cancer survival or recovery.

== Inflammation ==
Like many cytokines, CCL17 is inflammatory, so while it plays a largely helpful role in attacking cancers, it can induce inflammatory diseases, including allergic skin diseases. Because of its inflammatory effects, much of the medical research is on methods to mitigate CCL17. Neutralizing CCL17 with monoclonal antibodies has been shown to relieve inflammatory arthritis and osteoarthritis. Topical steroids have been found to be an effective tool in normalizing levels of CCL17.

== Autoimmunity ==
CCL17 is known to help leukocytes (and especially eosinophils) target their response to skin-located pathogens. This often occurs through the CCL17-CCR4 interaction on type 2 T helper cells, which then secrete a variety of interleukins. Direct interactions between CCL17 and eosinophils has been observed but not well defined. However, overexpressed CCL17 has been linked to atopic dermatitis (eczema) and multiple sclerosis, among other autoimmune diseases. Studies have shown that children with allergies and atopic dermatitis have higher quantiles of CCL17 compared to children without allergies. As such, therapeutic approaches involving CCL17 regulation have shown some success in several cases. This intervention often involves interfering with CCR4 through monoclonal antibody treatment (such as mogamulizumab). Another option is small-molecule interaction with CCR4, which has not yet had any clinical success.

=== Atopic dermatitis (eczema) ===
Researchers have found that type 2 helper-T cells in lesions of atopic dermatitis (AD) express more IL-4 and IL-13 than unaffected Th2 cells. Dendritic cells respond to IL-4 and IL-13 by secreting CCL17 (as well as CCL18 and CCL22), especially in "barrier-disrupted" skin (such as lesional skin). Because CCL17 is a key attractant for Th2, this creates a cycle of Th2 recruitment, IL-4 and IL-13 signaling, dendritic cell secretion of CCL17, and further recruitment of Th2 cells. Severity of AD is therefore correlated with concentration of CCL17 and CCL22 in both the blood serum and interstitial fluid of pediatric and adult patients with either acute or chronic AD. Because Th2 cells are present at elevated levels during pregnancy, a buildup of CCL17 in umbilical cord blood may summon more Th2 cells, causing the aforementioned positive feedback loop. This is correlated with a higher likelihood of developing AD (and other allergic diseases) in infants (including for mothers without AD), especially for the first two years of infancy.

In adult patients, other signals (such as IL-22) have been shown to correlate with the severity and chronicity of AD in addition to levels of CCL17, although the causal relationships between each of these other signals and CCL17 are not all yet known. Other signaling components, like TSLP, are induced by other lesional epidermal cells and directly upregulate CCL17 production.

Clinically, CCL17 has recently shown promise as a useful biomarker for AD severity as well as efficacy of treatment. Historically, physicians have used mostly visual, qualitative evaluations of lesion progress, but using CCL17 to quantify AD has allowed for more precise and accurate records of progress (or regression) during treatment. In concert with this, proposed treatments for AD include topical regulation of CCL17. Especially for infantile AD, where prolonged AD has been linked to severe food allergies, early quantification and treatment is especially important. This treatment may take the form of small-molecule inhibition of CCL17-CCR4 binding, which inhibits recruitment of Th2 cells and subsequent development of lesions.

=== Multiple sclerosis (and EAE) ===
Multiple sclerosis (MS) (and the animal model EAE) are autoimmune diseases characterized in part by changes in the expression and regulation of CCL17 in cerebrospinal fluid. There is also evidence to suggest that certain SNPs in the CCL17 and CCL22 genes may raise the risk of MS for an individual.

While type 2 helper T (Th2) cells are a key component of AD because they are localized to the skin through the CCL17-CCR4 interaction, memory Th17 cells seem to express high levels of CCR4 in both human and murine models of MS and are therefore likely candidates for study and therapy.

Treatments of MS (such as natalizumab or methylprednisolone) seem to lower overall chemokine levels (notably including either CCL17 itself or factors that are known to induce CCL17 production) in addition to other purported primary functions. However, these findings are complicated by CCR4 up- and downregulation findings, which have sometimes seemed counter to the CCL17 localization pathways. Experimental explorations with CCL17-deficient mice have therefore counterintuitively given different information than experiments measuring CCR4 regulation for EAE.

=== Other disorders ===
Several other disorders are also correlated with high levels of CCL17 or use CCL17 to localize Th2 cells. CCL17 can act as an inflammatory agent or as a symptom, and in either case, disrupting or manipulating the expression or ligand binding offers a therapeutic target. And, regardless of therapeutic potential, it can be used as a biomarker of disease.

- Drug rash with eosinophilia and systemic symptoms (DRESS)
- Bullous pemphigoid (BP)
- Senile erythroderma
- Eosinophilic pustular folliculitis
- Chronic spontaneous urticaria (hives)
- Maculopapular exanthema
- Stevens-Johnson syndrome/toxic epidermal necrolysis
- (Non-)episodic angioedema with eosinophilia
- Allergic asthma
- Allergic rhinitis/chronic rhinosinusitis with nasal polyps (CRSwNP)
- Eosinophilic granulomatosis with polyangiitis (Churg-Strauss syndrome)
- Acute and chronic eosinophilic pneumonia
- Mycosis fungoides (MF)
- Sezary syndrome (SS)
- Lymphocytic variant HES
- Acute disseminated encephalomyelitis (ADEM)
- Neuromyelitis optica (NMO) (Devic's disease)

== Chromosomal location ==
In humans the gene for CCL17 is located on chromosome 16 along with other chemokines including CCL22 and CX3CL1.
