= CX3C motif chemokine receptor 1 =

Protein found in humans

CX3CR1

Identifiers
- Aliases: CX3CR1, CCRL1, CMKBRL1, CMKDR1, GPR13, GPRV28, V28, C-X3-C motif chemokine receptor 1
- External IDs: OMIM: 601470; MGI: 1333815; GeneCards: CX3CR1

Gene location (Human)
Chr.	Chromosome 3 (human)
Band	3p22.2	Start	39,263,495 bp
Band	3p22.2	End	39,281,735 bp

Gene location (Mouse)
Chr.	Chromosome 9 (mouse)
Band	9|9 F4	Start	119,730,682 bp
Band	9|9 F4	End	119,898,945 bp
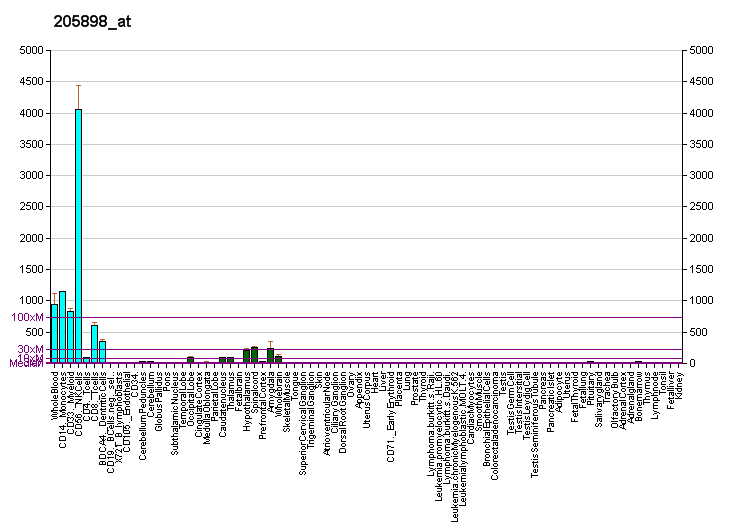
RNA expression pattern
Bgee	Human / Mouse (ortholog); Top expressed in: granulocyte; inferior ganglion of vagus nerve; superior vestibular nucleus; mononuclear cell; monocyte; ventral tegmental area; subthalamic nucleus; trigeminal ganglion; Region I of hippocampus proper; spinal ganglia / Top expressed in: lumbar subsegment of spinal cord; globus pallidus; internal carotid artery; nucleus accumbens; mesenteric lymph nodes; optic nerve; dorsal striatum; prefrontal cortex; external carotid artery; perirhinal cortex; More reference expression data
BioGPS	More reference expression data
Gene ontology
Molecular function	G protein-coupled receptor activity; C-X3-C chemokine receptor activity; signal transducer activity; protein binding; chemokine receptor activity; C-X3-C chemokine binding; cytokine receptor activity; G protein-coupled peptide receptor activity; C-C chemokine receptor activity; chemokine binding; C-C chemokine binding
Cellular component	integral component of membrane; membrane; plasma membrane; integral component of plasma membrane; neuronal cell body membrane; perinuclear region of cytoplasm; neuron projection; nucleus; nucleoplasm; external side of plasma membrane; cell surface; dendritic tree
Biological process	cellular response to transforming growth factor beta stimulus; positive regulation of neuroblast proliferation; G protein-coupled receptor signaling pathway; chemokine-mediated signaling pathway; memory; positive regulation of angiogenesis; chemotaxis; cellular defense response; cell adhesion; negative regulation of cell migration; response to wounding; negative regulation of long-term synaptic potentiation; viral process; cellular response to lipopolysaccharide; signal transduction; microglial cell activation involved in immune response; negative regulation of angiogenesis; cytokine-mediated signaling pathway; cerebral cortex cell migration; macrophage chemotaxis; negative regulation of extrinsic apoptotic signaling pathway in absence of ligand; response to ischemia; immune response; phospholipase C-activating G protein-coupled receptor signaling pathway; positive regulation of cytosolic calcium ion concentration; cell-cell signaling; calcium-mediated signaling; central nervous system maturation; negative regulation of interleukin-1 beta production; social behavior; autocrine signaling; innate immune response; regulation of nitric oxide biosynthetic process; regulation of synaptic plasticity; regulation of neurogenesis; positive regulation of neurogenesis; modulation of chemical synaptic transmission; leukocyte tethering or rolling; positive regulation of NF-kappaB transcription factor activity; positive regulation of protein kinase B signaling; synapse maturation; cell chemotaxis; synapse pruning; negative regulation of hippocampal neuron apoptotic process; multiple spine synapse organization, single dendrite; positive regulation of I-kappaB phosphorylation; regulation of microglial cell migration; negative regulation of apoptotic signaling pathway
Sources:Amigo / QuickGO
Orthologs
Databases	NCBI: entry; OMA: entry
Species	Human	Mouse
Entrez	1524	13051
Ensembl	ENSG00000168329	ENSMUSG00000052336
UniProt	P49238	Q9Z0D9
RefSeq (mRNA)	NM_001337; NM_001171171; NM_001171172; NM_001171174	NM_009987
RefSeq (protein)	NP_001164642; NP_001164643; NP_001164645; NP_001328	NP_034117
Location (UCSC)	Chr 3: 39.26 – 39.28 Mb	Chr 9: 119.73 – 119.9 Mb
PubMed search
- Wikidata
View/Edit Human	View/Edit Mouse

CX3C motif chemokine receptor 1 (CX3CR1), also known as the fractalkine receptor or G-protein coupled receptor 13 (GPR13), is a transmembrane protein of the G protein-coupled receptor 1 (GPCR1) family and the only known member of the CX3C chemokine receptor subfamily.

As the name suggests, this receptor binds the inflammatory chemokine CX3CL1 (also called neurotactin in mice or fractalkine in humans). This endogenous ligand solely binds to CX3CR1 receptor. Interaction of CX3CR1 with CX3CL1 can mediate migration, adhesion and retention of leukocytes, because fractalkine exists as membrane-anchored protein (mCX3CL1) as well as cleaved soluble molecule (sCX3CL1) due to proteolysis by metalloproteinases (MMPs). The shedded form carries out typical function of conventional chemokines, the chemotaxis, while the membrane-bound protein behaves as adhesion molecule for facilitation of diapedesis.

Both partners of CX3CL1-CX3CR1 axis are present on numerous cell types from hematopoietic and nonhematopoietic cells throughout the body. Moreover, their distinct cell expression is dependent on specific tissues and organs, which provides broad sphere of biological activity. Hence, considering their various functional activity, they are also linked with multiple neurodegenerative and inflammatory disorders as well as with tumorigenesis.

== Genetics ==
The coding gene for CX3CR1 is now officially called identically to its protein: CX3CR1 gene, but may be still referred to by other older names such as V28; CCRL1; GPR13; CMKDR1; GPRV28; CMKBRL1. A genome location of the gene in humans is on the short arm of the chromosome 3p22.2. It is composed of four exons (only one contains coding region) and three intronic elements. Expression of the genomic sequence is regulated via three promoters.

Two missense mutations in CX3CR1 gene, variants of single nucleotide polymorphism (SNP) of the receptor, are responsible for functional change of the protein. Names of these variants are derived from given substitution and its position: valine to isoleucine (V249I) and threonine to methionine (T280M). Polymorphism of CX3CR1 has been linked to diseases relating to cardiovascular system (e.g. atherosclerosis), nervous system (e.g. Alzheimer's disease) or infections (e.g. systemic candidiasis.)

Orthologs of CX3CR1 gene are found among animals, especially in mammals with high functional similarity, namely chimpanzee, dog, cat, mouse and rat. Orthologs are located on chromosome 9qF4 in the mouse genome and in the rat 8th chromosome on position 8q32.

== Expression ==
CX3CR1 is expressed constitutively or in inflammatory response in various cells from hematopoietic lineage: T lymphocytes, natural killer (NK) cells, dendritic cells, B lymphocytes, mast cells, monocytes, macrophages, neutrophils, microglia, osteoclasts and thrombocytes. Furthermore, this receptor can be also found in nonhematopoietic tissues such as endothelial cells, epithelial cells, myocytes and astrocytes. Considering the CX3CR1 abundance in the body, it was also found to be expressed by some types of malignant cells.

== Function ==
The CX3CR1 receptor is part of the G-protein chemokine receptor family with the metabotropic function. Its intracellular signalling cascades are responsible for modulating cell activity rather towards higher active state as in survival, migration and proliferation.

In the recognition of immune cells during inflammation, the function of CX3CL1-CX3CR1 axis in the bloodstream is mainly recruitment of immune cells by migration through chemotaxis and diapedesis. Of course, as a part of the inflammatory immune response against pathogens this role considered as protective. However, as with most immune cells and proteins, in inflammatory or autoimmune diseases, CX3CR1 signalling is associated with some disease's pathophysiology.

Expression of this receptor appears to be associated with lymphocytes. CX3CR1 is also expressed by monocytes and plays a major role in the survival of monocytes. Communication in blood vessels through the CX3CL1-CX3CR1 axis between endothelial cells and monocytes is responsible for formation of extracellular matrix and angiogenesis. It has been shown that CX3CR1 can influence monocytes already in bone marrow by means of retention and release. Moreover in bone marrow, CX3CR1 influences bone remodeling through role in differentiation of osteoclasts and osteoblasts.

The CX3CL1/CX3CR1 axis role in the nervous system is to mediate communication between microglia, neuroglia and neurons for regulation of microglia activity, hence this axis plays a neurodegenerative and neuroprotective function based on the physiological state.

Fractalkine signaling has also recently been discovered to play a developmental role in the migration of microglia in the central nervous system to their synaptic targets, where phagocytosis and synaptic refinement occur. CX3CR1 knockout mice had more synapses on hippocampal neurons than wild-type mice.

== Structure ==
CX3CR1 is integral membrane protein formed by 355 amino acids with molecular weight around 40 kDa, which consist of three distinguishable segments: extracellular, transmembrane and intracellular part. As a member of the biggest class of GPCR family the rhodopsin-like receptors, the intracellular part of receptor, C-terminus of the polypeptide and three intracellular loops, is a bounding place with conserved DRYLAIV motif for the heterotrimeric G protein. This family is also known as T-transmembrane receptors (7-TM) by reason of 7 α-helices of transmembrane protein, which are alternately located in the cell's cytoplasmic membrane. Extracellular side of CX3CR1 consists of N-terminus of the polypeptide chain and three extracellular loops, forming a binding place for its main ligand CX3CL1, but also CCL26 (Eotaxin-3): has lower binding affinity when compared to fractalkine), immunoglobulins or infectious agents.

== Signalling cascade ==
CX3CL1-CX3CR1 axis' signalling commences via activation of the receptor by its agonist's binding. It is followed by conformational change and component's dissociation of the heterotrimeric G complex, which consists of three subunits: α (alpha), β (beta) and γ (gamma). Several important signalling pathways are triggered by separated parts of G protein (Gα and Gβγ) such as the PLC/PKC pathway, the PI3K/AKT/NFκB pathway, the Ras/Raf/MEK/ERK (MAPK) pathway (or p38 and JNK) and the CREB pathway. All of those signalling cascades are responsible for diverse cellular behaviours and regulations, in terms of increased proliferation, survival and cell growth, metabolic regulation, induction of migration, apoptosis resistance and secretion of hormones and inflammatory cytokines. Products of CX3CR1 signalling cascades possess importance in the immune response of CX3CR1 positive hematopoietic cells.

== Clinical significance ==
CX3CR1 and immune cells are strongly connected due to its abundant cell surface expression. Therefore, clinical meaning of CX3CR1 can be found in diseases connected with immunity. CX3CR1 is able to increase accumulation of immune cells in the affected body part, which results in disease aggravation. Few examples: allergies, Rheumatoid arthritis, Renal diseases, Chronic liver disease or Crohn's disease.

CX3CR1 is also a coreceptor for HIV-1, and some variations in this gene lead to increased susceptibility to HIV-1 infection and rapid progression to AIDS.

Since CX3CR1 plays a major role for interaction between endothelial cells and immune cells, it can aid vascular build up on the artery walls (plaque), thus it has been associated with Atherosclerosis. In addition, this may lead to thrombosis, other cardiovascular diseases or even cerebral ischemia.

CX3CL1-CX3CR1 axis has an ability to control neurological inflammation through activation of microglia. Its role in brain pathologies can be therefore protective but also detrimental. There are connections between microglia and neurodegenerative disorders like Alzheimer's disease, Parkinson's disease or even with neurocognitive HIV-dementia. Moreover, CX3CR1 variants have been described to modify the survival time and the progression rate of patients with amyotrophic lateral sclerosis.

Mutations in CX3CR1 are associated to dysplasia of the hip. Homozygous CX3CR1-M280 mutation impairs human monocyte survival and deteriorates outcome of human systemic candiasis.

As mentioned before, this receptor and its ligand are important for the metabolism of the bone tissue in terms of differentiation of osteoclasts and osteoblasts. Overactivation of osteoclasts as well as accumulation of other immune cells has been linked to Osteoporosis.

CX3CR1 with fractalkine have a role in various types of cancer (e.g. neuroblastoma, prostate cancer, gastric adenocarcinoma or B cell lymphomas) where CX3CL1-CX3CR1 axis is a double agent, providing antitumoral effects (stimulating and recruiting immune cells to target neoplasm) and protumoral effects (stimulating important activity in malignant cells like: invasion, proliferation and apoptosis resistance, for facilitating metastasis). Therefore, it has potential as a therapeutictarget in cancer.
