= Clare Lloyd =

Scientist

Clare Lloyd FRSB
- Born: Clare Margaret Lloyd
- Education: King's College London (PhD)
- Scientific career
- Fields: Inflammation
- Workplaces: Imperial College London; Harvard University; Millennium Pharmaceuticals
- Thesis: Mechanisms of nephritis during murine malarial infections (1991)
- Website: imperial.ac.uk/people/c.lloyd

Clare Margaret Lloyd FRSB FMedSci is a Professor of Medicine and Vice Dean for Institutional Affairs at Imperial College London. She investigates allergic immunity in early life.

== Early life and education ==
Lloyd earned her BSc and PhD in immunology at King's College London. She earned her Bachelor's degree in 1987 and her PhD in 1991. She was awarded a National Kidney Research Fund Fellowship and joined the United Medical and Dental Schools of Guy's and St Thomas' Hospitals. Her work considered mouse models of glomerulonephritis. She joined Harvard University to work on chronic inflammatory glomerulonephritis. She became interested in the mechanisms of cell recruitment. She was involved with early studies that looking at the cloning, expression and function of chemokine. Her group demonstrated that T helper cells were the initial responders to CCR3 and CCR4 pathways, but the increase in CCR4 positive cells results in the long-term representation of T helper cells in vivo. LLoyd studied the role of these chemokines in allergic lung inflammation. She looked to better characterise the spatial patterns of chemokine expression to inform therapeutic strategies that limit the side-effects of allergen exposure.

== Career and research ==
After her postdoctoral fellowship at Harvard University, Lloyd joined at Millennium Pharmaceuticals in 1996 to work on models to characterise novel genes. She returned to the UK in 1999, joining Imperial College London as a Wellcome Trust Senior Fellow. She continued her interest in allergens, looking at the roles for cells and molecules involved in pulmonary inflammation. She is part of the Asthma UK Centre in Allergic Mechanisms of Asthma. She is a member of the British Society for Immunology and Wellcome Trust Infection, Immunity and Immunophenotyping. Lloyd studies the lung cells of children who suffer from asthma and severe wheeze. She has studied why pollen and dust can trigger reactions in some people but not others. She became interested in why exposure to allergens and infections in early life had such an influence on programming pathways to maintain pulmonary homeostasis. She demonstrated that Interleukin 9 can mediate inflammation of asthma.

She was appointed Professor in Respiratory Immunology in 2006. She is co-lead of the respiratory division. Her research group, the Lloyd Lab, looks at the interactions between lung cells and infiltrating inflammatory cells. Lloyd was awarded the Imperial College London Rectors Medal for her Research Supervision in 2014. In 2018, she demonstrated that the ICOS/ICOS‐L pathway could be a therapeutic target in asthma.

=== Academic service ===
She was the lead National Heart and Lung Institute Athena Swan lead between 2009 and 2014, achieving the first Silver award for a medical department in the UK. She pushed for the improvement of the Imperial College London mentoring scheme, in an effort to support early career researchers. In 2016 she was appointed Dean of Institutional Affairs at Imperial College London. She serves on the scientific advisory board of Science Magazine and is an editor of Nature Mucosal Immunology and the European Journal of Immunology. She serves on the Royal Society Newton International Fellowships board.

=== Awards and honours ===
- Lloyd was elected a Fellow of the Royal Society of Biology (FRSB)
- Lloyd was elected a Fellow of the Academy of Medical Sciences in 2019
