= Eosinophilic pustular folliculitis of infancy =

- Other names: Eosinophilic pustular folliculitis in infancy, infantile eosinophilic pustular folliculitis, and neonatal eosinophilic pustular folliculitis
- Specialty: Dermatology

Eosinophilic pustular folliculitis of infancy, also known as eosinophilic pustular folliculitis in infancy, infantile eosinophilic pustular folliculitis, and neonatal eosinophilic pustular folliculitis, is a cutaneous condition characterized by recurrent pruritic crops of follicular vesiculopustular lesions.

== See also ==
- Eosinophilic pustular folliculitis
- List of cutaneous conditions
