= CX3CL1 =

Protein-coding gene in humans

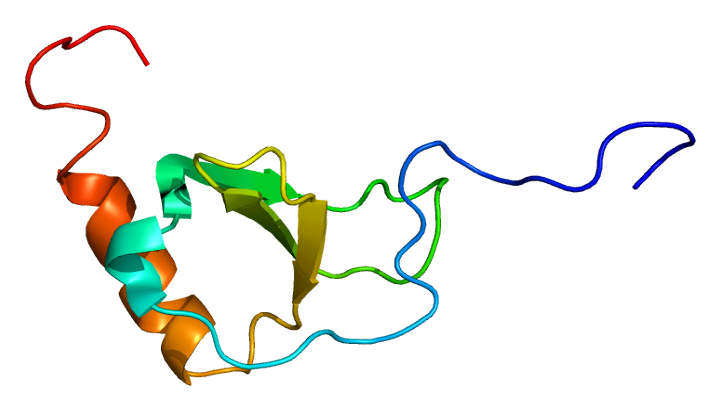

Identifiers
- Aliases: CX3CL1, ABCD-3, C3Xkine, CXC3, CXC3C, NTN, NTT, SCYD1, fractalkine, neurotactin, C-X3-C motif chemokine ligand 1
- External IDs: OMIM: 601880; MGI: 1097153; GeneCards: CX3CL1
Available structures
| PDB | Ortholog search: PDBe RCSB |
| PDB | List of PDB id codes 1B2T, 1F2L, 3ONA, 4XT1, 4XT3 |

Gene location (Human)
| Chr. | Chromosome 16 (human) |
| Band | 16q21 | Start | 57,372,477 bp |
| Band | 16q21 | End | 57,385,044 bp |

Gene location (Mouse)
| Chr. | Chromosome 8 (mouse) |
| Band | 8 C5|8 46.79 cM | Start | 95,498,637 bp |
| Band | 8 C5|8 46.79 cM | End | 95,509,055 bp |
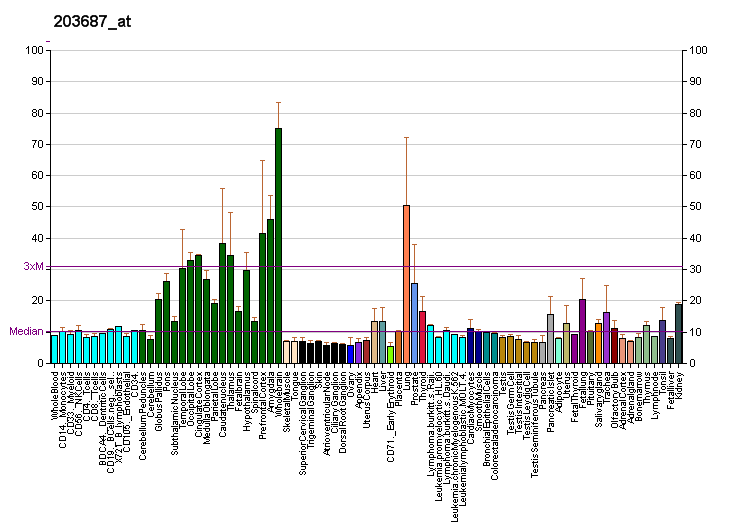

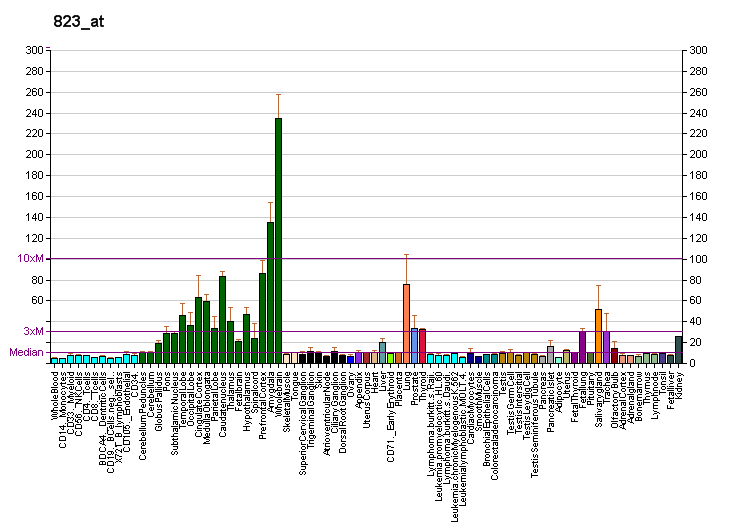
RNA expression pattern
| Bgee | Human / Mouse (ortholog); Top expressed in: right lung; right coronary artery; prefrontal cortex; olfactory zone of nasal mucosa; frontal pole; ascending aorta; Descending thoracic aorta; right frontal lobe; popliteal artery; tibial arteries / Top expressed in: perirhinal cortex; entorhinal cortex; CA3 field; visual cortex; primary visual cortex; olfactory tubercle; superior frontal gyrus; primary motor cortex; prefrontal cortex; nucleus accumbens; More reference expression data |
| BioGPS | More reference expression data |
Gene ontology
| Molecular function | cytokine activity; chemokine activity; protein binding; CCR chemokine receptor binding; signaling receptor binding; integrin binding; CX3C chemokine receptor binding |
| Cellular component | integral component of membrane; membrane; plasma membrane; extracellular region; cell surface; extracellular space |
| Biological process | G protein-coupled receptor signaling pathway; defense response; positive regulation of inflammatory response; monocyte chemotaxis; cytokine-mediated signaling pathway; chemokine-mediated signaling pathway; angiogenesis involved in wound healing; cellular response to tumor necrosis factor; wound healing; leukocyte chemotaxis; neutrophil chemotaxis; positive regulation of angiogenesis; positive regulation of transforming growth factor beta1 production; positive regulation of GTPase activity; cell adhesion; immune response; cellular response to interleukin-1; leukocyte adhesive activation; positive regulation of ERK1 and ERK2 cascade; cellular response to interferon-gamma; cell chemotaxis; lymphocyte chemotaxis; negative regulation of extrinsic apoptotic signaling pathway in absence of ligand; positive regulation of calcium-independent cell-cell adhesion; chemotaxis; integrin activation; negative regulation of cell migration; leukocyte migration involved in inflammatory response; macrophage chemotaxis; regulation of signaling receptor activity |
Sources:Amigo / QuickGO
Orthologs
| Databases | NCBI: entry; OMA: entry |
| Species | Human | Mouse |
| Entrez | 6376 | 20312 |
| Ensembl | ENSG00000006210 | ENSMUSG00000031778 |
| UniProt | P78423 | O35188 |
| RefSeq (mRNA) | NM_002996; NM_001304392 | NM_009142 |
| RefSeq (protein) | NP_001291321; NP_002987 | NP_033168 |
| Location (UCSC) | Chr 16: 57.37 – 57.39 Mb | Chr 8: 95.5 – 95.51 Mb |
| PubMed search |
- Wikidata
| View/Edit Human | View/Edit Mouse |

Fractalkine, also known as chemokine (C-X3-C motif) ligand 1, is a protein that in humans is encoded by the CX3CL1 gene.

== Tissue distribution ==
Fractalkine is found commonly throughout the brain, particularly in neural cells, and its receptor is known to be present on microglial cells. It has also been found to be essential for microglial cell migration. CX3CL1 is also up-regulated in the hippocampus during a brief temporal window following spatial learning, the purpose of which may be to regulate glutamate-mediated neurotransmission tone. This indicates a possible role for the chemokine in the protective plasticity process of synaptic scaling.

== Structure ==
Fractalkine is a large cytokine protein of 373 amino acids that contains multiple domains and is the only known member of the CX_{3}C chemokine family. It is also commonly known under the names fractalkine (in humans) and neurotactin (in mice). The polypeptide structure of CX3CL1 differs from the typical structure of other chemokines. For example, the spacing of the characteristic N-terminal cysteines differs; there are three amino acids separating the initial pair of cysteines in CX3CL1, with none in CC chemokines and only one intervening amino acid in CXC chemokines. CX3CL1 is produced as a long protein (with 373-amino acid in humans) with an extended mucin-like stalk and a chemokine domain on top. The mucin-like stalk permits it to bind to the surface of certain cells. However a soluble (90 kD) version of this chemokine has also been observed.

== Function ==
Soluble CX3CL1 potently chemoattracts T cells and monocytes, while the cell-bound chemokine promotes strong adhesion of leukocytes to activated endothelial cells, where it is primarily expressed. CX3CL1 elicits its adhesive and migratory functions by interacting with the chemokine receptor CX3CR1. Its gene is located on human chromosome 16 along with some CC chemokines known as CCL17 and CCL22.
