= Kalipada Pahan =

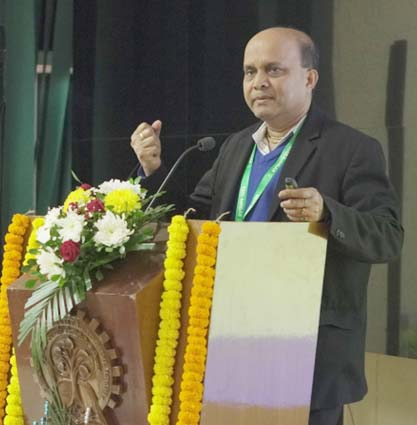
- Born: 19 February 1964 (age 62); Midnapore, West Bengal, India
- Occupations: Professor, Neuroscientist
- Known for: Research on statins (cholesterol-lowering drugs) and cinnamon

Kalipada Pahan (born 19 February 1964, Midnapore) is a professor of Neurological Sciences, Biochemistry, and Pharmacology, holding the Floyd A. Davis, M.D., Endowed Chair in Neurology at Rush University Medical Center. He is also a research career scientist at the Department of Veterans Affairs, Jesse Brown VA Medical Center. An Indian American neuroscientist, Pahan focuses on translational research related to multiple sclerosis, Parkinson's disease, Alzheimer's disease, dementia, and Batten disease .

== Early life and education ==
Pahan was born in 1964 at a remote Indian village (Muksudpur) in Midnapore, West Bengal, India. He received his early education in Muksudpur High School and Changrachak High School followed by bachelor’s in Chemistry from Midnapore College, a renowned autonomous college, which was then under the University of Calcutta.

After completing his graduation, he moved to Kolkata to pursue a Masters’ degree in Biochemistry and then completed Ph.D. in Biochemistry with Departmental fellowship. In 1992, he came to Medical University of South Carolina (MUSC), Charleston, SC for pursuing his post-doctoral studies, where he rose to the rank of Assistant Professor in 1998. In 1999, he moved to the College of Dentistry in University of Nebraska Medical Center as an Assistant Professor of Biochemistry. He was promoted to Associate Professor of Biochemistry in 2002. In 2006, he moved to Rush University Medical Center as a Professor and Floyd. A. Davis, M.D., Endowed Chair of Neurology.

== Career ==
Pahan is regarded for his contributions to research on statins, cholesterol-lowering medications. His initial investigations focused on the role of statins in suppressing inflammatory responses within microglia, astroglia, and macrophages. Pahan has conducted pioneering research into the efficacy of statins for neuronal diseases. His laboratory later demonstrated that statins have potential neuroprotective effects and may enhance locomotor activity in Parkinson's disease by inhibiting activation of p21/Ras. Pahan's research further revealed that statins can exert HMG CoA reductase-independent actions, supporting cognitive function via the PPAR-alpha-CREB pathway. Most recently, his research has characterized a novel interaction between lipid metabolism and memory, indicating that the lipid-regulating transcription factor PPAR-alpha modulates hippocampal memory formation via transcriptional regulation of CREB (Roy et al., 2013, Cell Reports 4: 724–737), providing a potential explanation for the observed association between increased abdominal fat and memory impairment.

His laboratory is also known for its research on cinnamon, where findings indicate that this widely used spice may offer benefits for various neurological disorders, including enhancing memory and learning in individuals with learning difficulties.

== Awards & honors ==
He has written book chapters and published more than 200 articles in journals including Journal of Biological Chemistry, Journal of Immunology, Journal of Neuroscience, Cell Death and Differentiation, Proceedings of the National Academy of Sciences of the United States of America, Journal of Clinical Investigation, Science Signaling, Cell Reports, Cell Metabolism, Nature Communications, and Nature Chemical Biology. His research on aspirin was featured in Society for Neuroscience 2019 Hot Topic. He is the recipient of "D. H. Reinhardt Scholar" award from the University of Nebraska Medical Center (UNMC) College of Dentistry, the "Silver U" award from the UNMC Chancellor's council, and the outstanding teaching award from the UNMC College of Dentistry. He also received the Joseph Wybran, M.D., Award from the Society on Neuroimmune Pharmacology and the Zenith Fellows Award from the Alzheimer's Association.[
