= CCR4 =

Protein-coding gene in humans

Identifiers
- Aliases: CCR4, CC-CKR-4, CD194, CKR4, CMKBR4, ChemR13, HGCN:14099, K5-5, C-C motif chemokine receptor 4
- External IDs: OMIM: 604836; MGI: 107824; GeneCards: CCR4

Gene location (Human)
Chr.	Chromosome 3 (human)
Band	3p22.3	Start	32,951,644 bp
Band	3p22.3	End	32,956,349 bp

Gene location (Mouse)
Chr.	Chromosome 9 (mouse)
Band	9 F3|9 64.49 cM	Start	114,319,384 bp
Band	9 F3|9 64.49 cM	End	114,333,984 bp
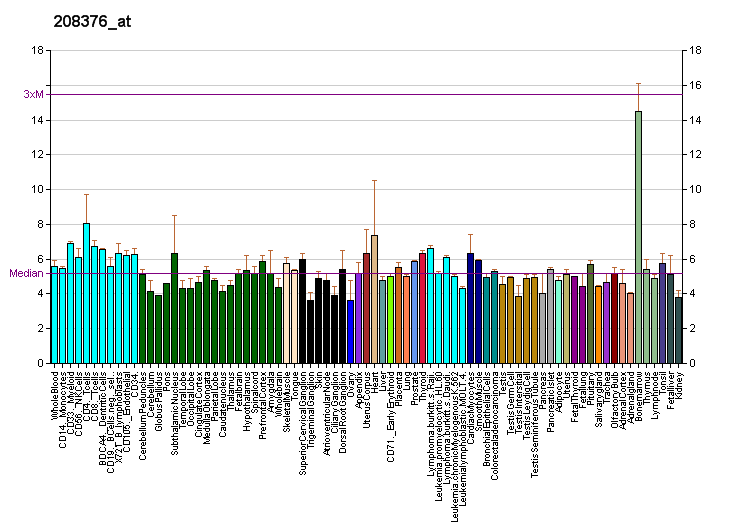
RNA expression pattern
Bgee	Human / Mouse (ortholog); Top expressed in: testicle; appendix; lymph node; granulocyte; gallbladder; monocyte; blood; bone marrow cell; rectum; spleen / Top expressed in: thymus; morula; embryo; lumbar subsegment of spinal cord; yolk sac; lip; blastocyst; meninges; spermatid; zone of skin; More reference expression data
BioGPS	More reference expression data
Gene ontology
Molecular function	C-C chemokine receptor activity; G protein-coupled receptor activity; chemokine receptor activity; signal transducer activity; protein binding; chemokine binding; C-C chemokine binding
Cellular component	integral component of membrane; plasma membrane; integral component of plasma membrane; external side of plasma membrane; membrane; soma; intracellular anatomical structure
Biological process	positive regulation of cytosolic calcium ion concentration; chemotaxis; chemokine-mediated signaling pathway; inflammatory response; neuron migration; homeostasis of number of cells; immune response; signal transduction; tolerance induction; response to bacterium; response to antibiotic; response to radiation; positive regulation of positive chemotaxis; G protein-coupled receptor signaling pathway; calcium-mediated signaling; cell chemotaxis
Sources:Amigo / QuickGO
Orthologs
Databases	NCBI: entry; OMA: entry
Species	Human	Mouse
Entrez	1233	12773
Ensembl	ENSG00000183813	ENSMUSG00000047898
UniProt	P51679	P51680
RefSeq (mRNA)	NM_005508	NM_009916
RefSeq (protein)	NP_005499	NP_034046
Location (UCSC)	Chr 3: 32.95 – 32.96 Mb	Chr 9: 114.32 – 114.33 Mb
PubMed search
- Wikidata
View/Edit Human	View/Edit Mouse

C-C chemokine receptor type 4 is a protein that in humans is encoded by the CCR4 gene. CCR4 has also been designated CD194 (cluster of differentiation 194).

The protein encoded by this gene belongs to the G protein-coupled receptor family. It is a receptor for the following CC chemokines:

- CCL2 (MCP-1)
- CCL4 (MIP-1)
- CCL5 (RANTES)
- CCL17 (TARC)
- CCL22 (Macrophage-derived chemokine)

Chemokines are a group of small structurally related proteins that regulate cell trafficking of various types of leukocytes. The chemokines also play fundamental roles in the development, homeostasis, and function of the immune system, and they have effects on cells of the central nervous system as well as on endothelial cells involved in angiogenesis or angiostasis.

CCR4 is a cell-surface protein and should not be confused with the unrelated carbon catabolite repression-negative on TATA-less (CCR4-Not), a nuclear protein complex that regulates gene expression.

== Clinical significance ==
CCR4 is often expressed on leukemic cells in cutaneous T-cell lymphoma (CTCL).

=== As a drug target ===
Mogamulizumab is a humanised monoclonal antibody targeted at CCR4 and is an investigational drug for CTCL.
