= Allograft inflammatory factor 1 =

Protein-coding gene in the species Homo sapiens

AIF1
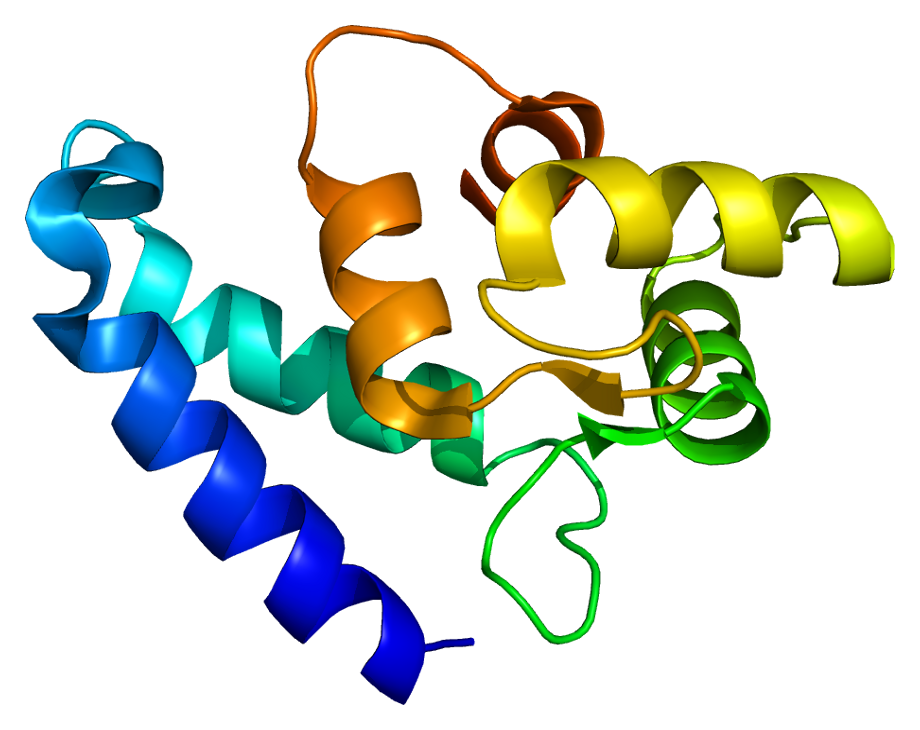

Identifiers
- Aliases: AIF1, AIF-1, IBA1, IRT-1, IRT1, allograft inflammatory factor 1, Iba-1
- External IDs: OMIM: 601833; MGI: 1343098; GeneCards: AIF1
Available structures
PDB	Ortholog search: PDBe RCSB
PDB	List of PDB id codes 2D58, 2G2B

Gene location (Human)
Chr.	Chromosome 6 (human)
Band	6p21.33	Start	31,615,217 bp
Band	6p21.33	End	31,617,021 bp

Gene location (Mouse)
Chr.	Chromosome 17 (mouse)
Band	17 B1|17 18.59 cM	Start	35,389,967 bp
Band	17 B1|17 18.59 cM	End	35,395,044 bp
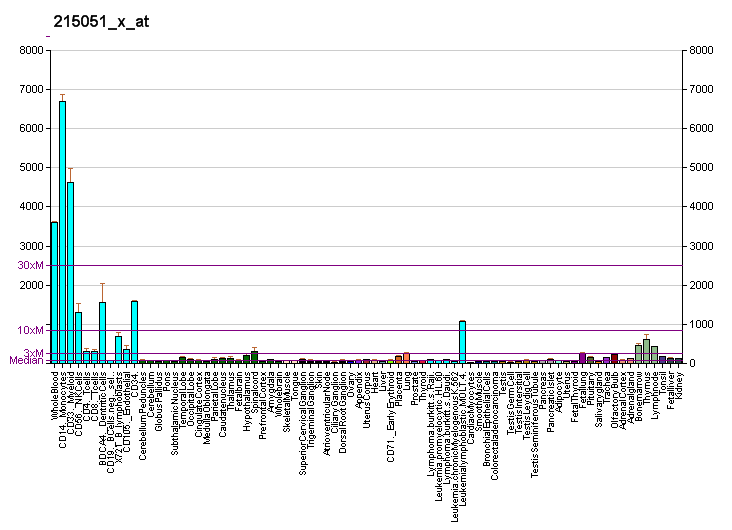

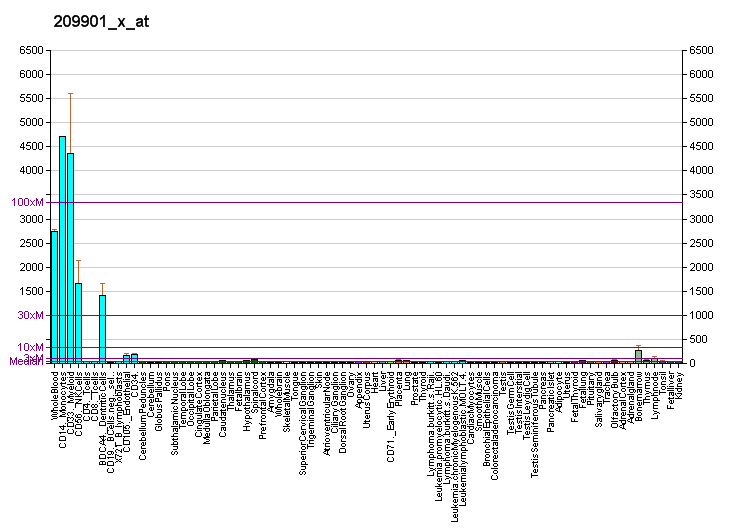

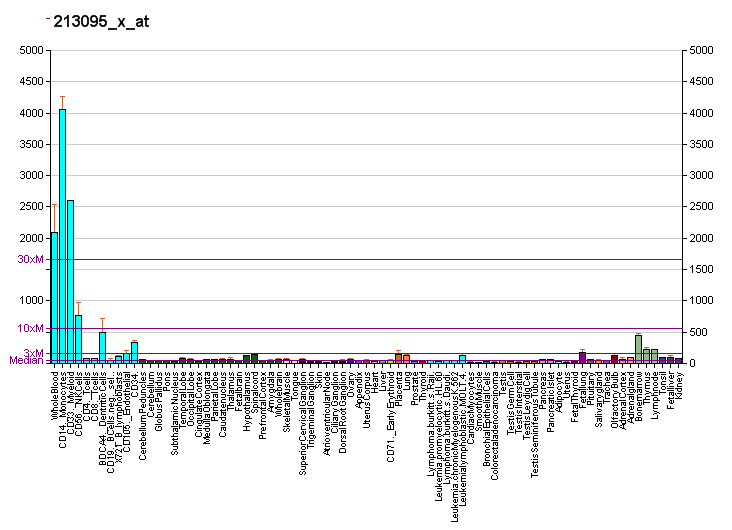
RNA expression pattern
Bgee	Human / Mouse (ortholog); Top expressed in: monocyte; granulocyte; bone marrow cell; testicle; right lung; gallbladder; C1 segment; rectum; spleen; right coronary artery / Top expressed in: seminiferous tubule; mesenteric lymph nodes; spermatid; spleen; stroma of bone marrow; thymus; spermatocyte; subcutaneous adipose tissue; optic nerve; aortic valve; More reference expression data
BioGPS	More reference expression data
Gene ontology
Molecular function	calcium ion binding; metal ion binding; actin filament binding; actin binding; molecular function
Cellular component	cytoplasm; cytosol; perikaryon; cell projection; membrane; ruffle; plasma membrane; ruffle membrane; actin filament; perinuclear region of cytoplasm; phagocytic cup; cytoskeleton; nucleus; lamellipodium
Biological process	cellular response to extracellular stimulus; positive regulation of smooth muscle cell chemotaxis; response to cytokine; positive regulation of protein phosphorylation; negative regulation of smooth muscle cell proliferation; positive regulation of cell migration; positive regulation of muscle hyperplasia; positive regulation of nitric oxide biosynthetic process; positive regulation of monocyte chemotaxis; negative regulation of apoptotic process; response to glucocorticoid; response to electrical stimulus; negative regulation of gene expression; cellular response to hydroperoxide; actin filament bundle assembly; microglial cell activation; positive regulation of G1/S transition of mitotic cell cycle; actin filament polymerization; negative regulation of smooth muscle cell chemotaxis; cellular response to hormone stimulus; phagocytosis, engulfment; response to axon injury; positive regulation of T cell proliferation; cellular response to interferon-gamma; cellular response to morphine; Rac protein signal transduction; inflammatory response; ruffle assembly; positive regulation of T cell migration; positive regulation of smooth muscle cell proliferation; cerebellum development; positive regulation of cell population proliferation; regulation of gene expression; parallel actin filament bundle assembly; cellular response to oxidative stress; positive regulation of chemotaxis; actin crosslink formation; positive regulation of mononuclear cell migration; positive regulation of fibroblast growth factor production
Sources:Amigo / QuickGO
Orthologs
Databases	NCBI: entry; OMA: entry
Species	Human	Mouse
Entrez	199	11629
Ensembl	ENSG00000206428; ENSG00000235985; ENSG00000235588; ENSG00000234836; ENSG00000237727 ENSG00000204472	ENSMUSG00000024397
UniProt	P55008; Q4V347	O70200
RefSeq (mRNA)	NM_001623; NM_004847; NM_032955; NM_001318970	NM_019467; NM_001361501; NM_001361502
RefSeq (protein)	NP_001305899; NP_001614; NP_116573; NP_001614.3	NP_062340; NP_001348430; NP_001348431
Location (UCSC)	Chr 6: 31.62 – 31.62 Mb	Chr 17: 35.39 – 35.4 Mb
PubMed search
- Wikidata
View/Edit Human	View/Edit Mouse

Allograft inflammatory factor 1 (AIF-1) also known as ionized calcium-binding adapter molecule 1 (IBA1) is a protein that in humans is encoded by the AIF1 gene.

== Gene ==
The AIF1 gene is located within a segment of the major histocompatibility complex class III region. It has been shown that this gene is highly expressed in testis, spleen, and brain but weakly expressed in lung, and kidney. Among brain cells, the Iba1 gene is strongly and specifically expressed in microglia. Circulating macrophages also express Iba1.

== Function ==
AIF1 is a protein that exists in the cytoplasm, and it is highly evolutionarily conserved. It is also possibly identical to three other proteins, Iba-2, MRF-1 (microglia response factor) and daintain. However complete functional profiles of all three proteins and how they overlap is unknown. IBA1 is a 17-kDa EF hand protein that is specifically expressed in macrophages / microglia and is upregulated during the activation of these cells. Iba1 expression is up-regulated in microglia following nerve injury, central nervous system ischemia, and several other brain diseases.

AIF1 was originally discovered in atherosclerotic lesions in a rat model of chronic allograft cardiac rejection. It was found to be upregulated in macrophages and neutrophils in response to the cytokine IFN-γ. AIF1 expression has been seen to increase in vascular tissue in response to arterial injury, specifically it is found in activated vascular smooth muscle cells in response to IFN-γ, IL-1β, and T-cell conditioned media. In vascular smooth muscle cells, activation is responsible for arterial thickening in allografts through over proliferation. AIF1 has been found to enhance growth and promote proliferation in vascular smooth muscle cells through deregulation of the cell cycle. It does this by shortening the cell cycle and altering the expression of cyclins. Though histologically different, AIF1 has also been shown to promote the proliferation and activation of endothelial cells (EC). EC activation, leads to proliferation and migration of cells, which is involved in multiple normal vascular processes, such as atherosclerosis, angiogenesis, and wound healing. It is currently theorized that AIF1 works to control endothelial cell proliferation and migration through action in signal transduction pathways. It has features of a cytoplasmic signaling protein, including several domains that allow for binding to multiprotein complexes, called PDZ domains. In endothelial cells, AIF1 has been specifically shown to regulate vasculogenesis, including the formation of aortic sprouting and tube-like formations. AIF1 been shown to interact with kinase p44/42 and PAK1, two previously known signal transduction molecules, in regulating these processes. AIF1 also shows distinct differences in the pathways by which it regulates endothelial cells, macrophages, and vascular smooth muscle cells. Upregulation of AIF-1 is connected with increased migration of mononuclear peripheral blood cell. In the CD14 positive cells, AIF-1 support secretion of IL-6 and various chemokines. AIF-1 may also play a role in the T-cell response. It has been shown that AIF-1 increases expression of IL-2 and IFN-γ in T-cells, while the expression of IL-4 and TGF-β is decreased. The presence of AIF-1 also inhibits polarization into regulatory T cells.

== Clinical significance ==
Allograft Inflammatory Factor 1 is found in activated macrophages. Activated macrophages are found in tissues with inflammation. AIF1 levels in healthy humans have been found to positively correlate with metabolic indicators, such as body mass index, triglycerides, and fasting plasma glucose levels. The excess of adipose tissue found in obese patients is found to cause chronic inflammation with an increase in the number of activated macrophages. Subsequently, AIF1 may be an accurate indicator of macrophage activation in the body. There is also evidence that AIF1 could be a marker for diabetic nephropathy when detected in serum. Since diabetic nephropathy is a consequence of long-term type 1 and type 2 diabetes, this consistent with evidence that AIF1 may be associated with other aspects of diabetes. It is found in activated macrophages in the pancreatic islets, and has been shown to decrease insulin secretion, while simultaneously impairing glucose elimination.

=== Role in cancer progression ===
In recent years, the possibility of a role for AIF-1 in cancer development has also been considered. Significantly higher levels of AIF-1 expression were found in hepatocarcinoma cell lines and in tissue compared to healthy samples. One option in which AIF-1 may contribute to the development of pathology is involvement in the proliferation and migration of tumor cells. It was also shown that AIF-1 promote cell proliferation in the breast cancer cells line. This effect was dependent on time and level of AIF-1 protein. Upregulation of AIF-1 enhanced activity of NF-ΚB and increased expression of cyclin D1. Cyclin D1 contribute to cell proliferation and mutation in this gene has been connected with variety of tumors. It has also been shown that AIF-1 expression can contribute to progression of cancer by inhibition of apoptosis in cells.

=== Role in Rheumatoid arthritis ===
The role of up-regulation of expression of AIF-1 was demonstrated in rheumatoid arthritis. Presence of AIF-1 was confirmed in synovial tissue of patient with this pathology. AIF-1 was strongly expressed in several cell types of synovial tissue, such as fibroblast and synovial cells, but also in infiltrated immune cells. It was also shown that upregulation of AIF-1 contribute to induction of enhances the production of IL-6 . Another factor by which the expression of AIF-1 affects the course of the disease is increased proliferation of synovial cells.

=== Role in kidney diseases ===
AIF-1 was also considered as a player in the diseases connected with fibrosis. For example, in kidney diseases overexpression of AIF-1 in the macrophages contributes to signaling through AKT and mTOR. Another way in which AIF-1 contribute to the pathology of kidney is upregulation of enzyme NADPH oxidase 2. This upregulation leads to oxidative stress in the cells and progression of renal injury. Expression of AIF-1 is considered to be linked with calcification in hemodyalisis patients. Higher presence of AIF-1/NF-κB/MCP-1/CCR-2-pathway was detected in calcifaied vascular smooth muscle cells. AIF-1 was also detected as a potential factor which contribue to apoptosis and inflammation.

=== Role in retinal diseases ===
Since the immune response in the retina is tightly regulated under physiological conditions, microglia may play a role in retinal diseases. Retinitis pigmentosa is an inherited disease in which photoreceptors are gradually degenerated. That condition gradually leads to reduced of dark vision and eventually complete blindness. In an experimental model RCS (The Royal College of Surgeons) rats with progression loss of photoreceptors, level of AIF-1 was elevated in retina in contrast to wild type
