= Eosinophilic folliculitis =

- Other names: Eosinophilic pustular folliculitis, Sterile eosinophilic pustulosis"
- Specialty: Dermatology

Eosinophilic folliculitis is an itchy rash with an unknown cause that is most common among individuals with HIV, though it can occur in HIV-negative individuals where it is known by the eponym Ofuji disease. EF consists of itchy red bumps (papules) centered on hair follicles and typically found on the upper body, sparing the abdomen and legs. The name eosinophilic folliculitis refers to the predominant immune cells associated with the disease (eosinophils) and the involvement of the hair follicles.

== Pathophysiology ==
The cause of EF is unknown. A variety of microorganisms have been implicated, including the mite Demodex, the yeast Pityrosporum, and bacteria. An autoimmune process has also been investigated.

== Diagnosis ==
Eosinophilic folliculitis may be suspected clinically when an individual with HIV exhibits the classic symptoms. The diagnosis can be supported by the finding of eosinophilia but a skin biopsy is necessary to establish it. Skin biopsies reveal lymphocytic and eosinophilic inflammation around the hair follicles.

== Treatment ==
Treatment of eosinophilic folliculitis in people with HIV typically begins with the initiation of Highly Active Anti-Retroviral Therapy in order to help reconstitute the immune system. Direct treatment of the EF itself focuses on decreasing the inflammation and itching. Topical corticosteroids and oral antihistamines can alleviate the itching and decrease the size and number of lesions. Treatment with the antifungal drug itraconazole, the antibiotic metronidazole, and the anti-mite drug permethrin may lead to some improvement of symptoms. Other therapies include PUVA, topical tacrolimus, and isotretinoin.

== Epidemiology ==
Eosinophilic folliculitis associated with HIV infection typically affects individuals with advanced HIV and low T helper cell counts. It affects both men and women as well as children with HIV and is found throughout the world.

EF may also affect individuals with hematologic disease such as leukemia and lymphoma. It may also affect otherwise normal infants in a self-limited form. HIV-negative individuals can also develop EF — this is more common in Japan.

== See also ==
- Eosinophilic pustular folliculitis of infancy
- List of cutaneous conditions
