= CCL22 =

Mammalian protein found in humans

Identifiers
- Aliases: CCL22, A-152E5.1, ABCD-1, DC/B-CK, MDC, SCYA22, STCP-1, C-C motif chemokine ligand 22
- External IDs: OMIM: 602957; MGI: 1306779; GeneCards: CCL22

Gene location (Human)
Chr.	Chromosome 16 (human)
Band	16q21	Start	57,358,783 bp
Band	16q21	End	57,366,189 bp
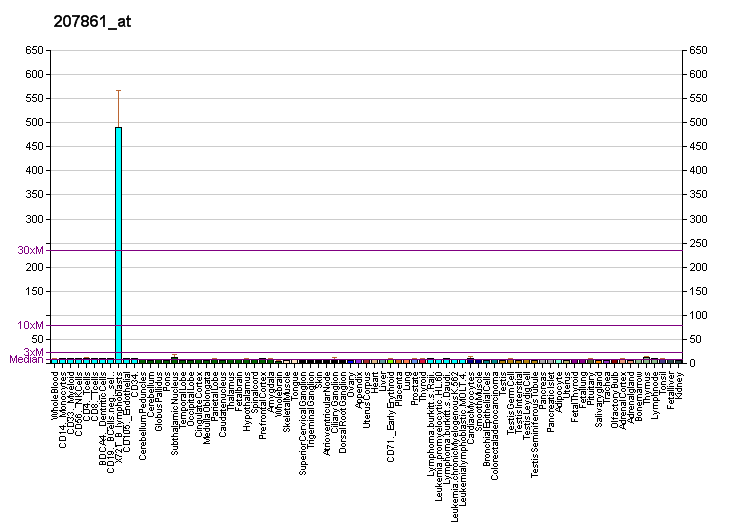
RNA expression pattern
Bgee	Human / Mouse (ortholog); Top expressed in: appendix; mucosa of urinary bladder; lymph node; rectum; pharynx; palpebral conjunctiva; vulva; tonsil; epithelium of colon; skin of abdomen / n/a; More reference expression data
BioGPS	More reference expression data
Gene ontology
Molecular function	cytokine activity; CCR chemokine receptor binding; chemokine activity
Cellular component	extracellular region; extracellular space
Biological process	G protein-coupled receptor signaling pathway; monocyte chemotaxis; chemokine-mediated signaling pathway; cell-cell signaling; cellular response to tumor necrosis factor; response to virus; neutrophil chemotaxis; chemotaxis; positive regulation of GTPase activity; immune response; cellular response to interleukin-1; positive regulation of ERK1 and ERK2 cascade; cellular response to interferon-gamma; cell chemotaxis; lymphocyte chemotaxis; signal transduction; inflammatory response; antimicrobial humoral immune response mediated by antimicrobial peptide; regulation of signaling receptor activity; cytokine-mediated signaling pathway; eosinophil chemotaxis
Sources:Amigo / QuickGO
Orthologs
Databases	NCBI: entry; OMA: entry
Species	Human	Mouse
Entrez	6367	20299
Ensembl	ENSG00000102962	n/a
UniProt	O00626	O88430
RefSeq (mRNA)	NM_002990	NM_009137
RefSeq (protein)	NP_002981	NP_033163
Location (UCSC)	Chr 16: 57.36 – 57.37 Mb	n/a
PubMed search
- Wikidata
View/Edit Human	View/Edit Mouse

C-C motif chemokine 22 is a protein that in humans is encoded by the CCL22 gene.

The protein encoded by this gene is secreted by dendritic cells and macrophages, and elicits its effects on its target cells by interacting with cell surface chemokine receptors such as CCR4. The gene for CCL22 is located in human chromosome 16 in a cluster with other chemokines called CX3CL1 and CCL17.
