= Neuroinflammation =

Inflammation of nervous tissue

Neuroinflammation is inflammation of the nervous tissue. It may be initiated in response to a variety of cues, including infection, traumatic brain injury, toxic metabolites, or autoimmunity. In the central nervous system (CNS), including the brain and spinal cord, microglia are the resident innate immune cells that are activated in response to these cues. The CNS is typically an immunologically privileged site because peripheral immune cells are generally blocked by the blood–brain barrier (BBB), a specialized structure composed of astrocytes and endothelial cells. However, circulating peripheral immune cells may surpass a compromised BBB and encounter neurons and glial cells expressing major histocompatibility complex molecules, perpetuating the immune response. Although the response is initiated to protect the central nervous system from the infectious agent, the effect may be toxic and widespread inflammation as well as further migration of leukocytes through the blood–brain barrier may occur.

== Causes ==
Neuroinflammation is widely regarded as chronic—as opposed to acute—inflammation of the central nervous system. Acute inflammation usually follows injury to the central nervous system immediately, and is characterized by inflammatory molecules, endothelial cell activation, platelet deposition, and tissue edema. Chronic inflammation is the sustained activation of glial cells and recruitment of other immune cells into the brain. Chronic inflammation is typically associated with neurodegenerative diseases. Common causes of chronic neuroinflammation include:

- Toxic metabolites
- Autoimmunity
- Ageing
- Microbes
- Viruses
- Traumatic brain injury
- Spinal cord injury
- Air pollution
- Passive smoke
- Blast Injury

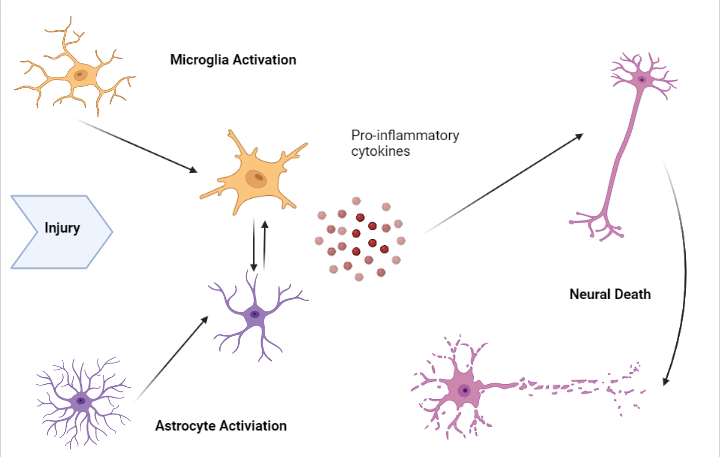
The initiation of neuroinflammation in the body.

Viruses, bacteria, and other infectious agents activate the body's defense systems, prompting immune cells to protect the affected area from damage. Some of these foreign pathogens can trigger a strong inflammatory response that can compromise the integrity of the blood-brain barrier and thus change the flow of inflammation in nearby tissue. The location, along with the type of infection, can determine which inflammatory response is activated and whether specific cytokines or immune cells will act.

== Neuroimmune response ==
=== Glial cells ===
Microglia are recognized as the innate immune cells of the central nervous system. Microglia actively survey their environment and change their cell morphology significantly in response to neural injury. Acute inflammation in the brain is typically characterized by rapid activation of microglia. During this period, there is no peripheral immune response. Over time, however, chronic inflammation causes tissue degradation and damage to the blood–brain barrier. During this time, microglia generate reactive oxygen species and release signals to recruit peripheral immune cells for an inflammatory response.

Astrocytes are glial cells that are the most abundant in the brain. They are involved in the maintenance and support of neurons and compose a significant component of the blood–brain barrier. After insult to the brain, such as traumatic brain injury, astrocytes may become activated in response to signals released by injured neurons or activated microglia. Once activated, astrocytes may release various growth factors and undergo morphological changes. For example, after injury, astrocytes form the glial scar composed of a proteoglycan matrix that hinders axonal regeneration. However, more recent studies revealed that glia scar is not detrimental, but is in fact beneficial for axonal regeneration.

=== Cytokines ===
Cytokines are a class of proteins that regulate inflammation, cell signaling, and various cellular processes, such as growth and survival. Chemokines are a subset of cytokines that regulate cell migration, such as attracting immune cells to a site of infection or injury. Various cell types in the brain may produce cytokines and chemokines, such as microglia, astrocytes, endothelial cells, and other glial cells. Physiologically, chemokines and cytokines function as neuromodulators that regulate inflammation and development. In the healthy brain, cells secrete cytokines to create a local inflammatory environment that recruits microglia and clears the infection or injury. However, in neuroinflammation, cells may sustain cytokine and chemokine release, which may compromise the blood–brain barrier. Peripheral immune cells are called to the site of injury via these cytokines and may now migrate across the compromised blood brain barrier into the brain. Common cytokines produced in response to brain injury include: interleukin-6 (IL-6), which is produced during astrogliosis, and interleukin-1 beta (IL-1β) and tumor necrosis factor alpha (TNF-α), which can induce neuronal cytotoxicity. Although pro-inflammatory cytokines may cause cell death and secondary tissue damage, they are necessary for tissue repair. For example, TNF-α causes neurotoxicity at early stages of neuroinflammation, but contributes to tissue growth at later stages of inflammation.

== Peripheral immune response ==
The blood–brain barrier is a structure composed of endothelial cells and astrocytes that forms a barrier between the brain and circulating blood. Physiologically, this enables the brain to be protected from potentially toxic molecules and cells in the blood. Astrocytes form tight junctions, and therefore may strictly regulate what may pass the blood–brain barrier and enter the interstitial space. After injury and sustained release of inflammatory factors such as chemokines, the blood–brain barrier may be compromised, becoming permeable to circulating blood components and peripheral immune cells. Cells involved in the innate and adaptive immune responses, such as macrophages, T cells, and B cells, may then enter into the brain. This exacerbates the inflammatory environment of the brain and contributes to chronic neuroinflammation and neurodegeneration.

== Traumatic brain injury ==
Traumatic brain injury (TBI) is brain trauma caused by significant force to the head. Following TBI, there are both reparative and degenerative mechanisms that lead to an inflammatory environment. Within minutes of injury, pro-inflammatory cytokines are released. The pro-inflammatory cytokine Il-1β is one such cytokine that exacerbates the tissue damage caused by TBI. TBI may cause significant damage to vital components to the brain, including the blood–brain barrier. Il-1β causes DNA fragmentation and apoptosis, and together with TNF-α may cause damage to the blood–brain barrier and infiltration of leukocytes. Increased density of activated immune cells have been found in the human brain after concussion.

As the most abundant immune cells in the brain, microglia are important to the brain's defense against injury. The major caveat of these cells comes from the fact that their ability to promote recovery mechanism with anti-inflammatory factors, is inhibited by their secondary ability to make a large amount of pro-inflammatory cytokines. This can result in sustained brain damage as anti-inflammatory factors decrease in amount when more pro-inflammatory cytokines are produced in excess by microglia. The cytokines produced by microglia, astrocytes, and other immune cells, activate glial cells further increasing the number of pro-inflammatory factors that further prevent neurological systems from recovering. The dual nature of microglia is one example of why neuroinflammation can be helpful or hurtful under specific conditions.

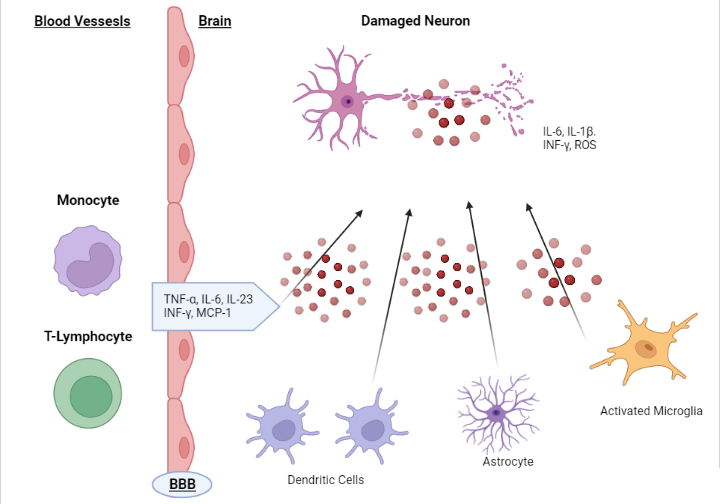
Role of neuroinflammation in the pathophysiology of TBI (created with BioRender.com)

== Spinal cord injury ==
Spinal cord injury (SCI) can be divided into three separate phases. The primary or acute phase occurs from seconds to minutes after injury, the secondary phase occurs from minutes to weeks after injury, and the chronic phase occurs from months to years following injury. A primary SCI is caused by spinal cord compression or transection, leading to glutamate excitotoxicity, sodium and calcium ion imbalances, and free radical damage. Neurodegeneration via apoptosis and demyelination of neuronal cells causes inflammation at the injury site. This leads to a secondary SCI, whose symptoms include edema, cavitation of spinal parenchyma, reactive gliosis, and potentially permanent loss of function.During the SCI-induced inflammatory response, several pro-inflammatory cytokines including interleukin 1β (IL-1β), inducible nitric oxide synthase (iNOS), interferon-γ (IFN-γ), IL-6, IL-23, and tumor necrosis factor α (TNFα) are secreted, activating local microglia and attracting various immune cells such as naive bone-marrow derived macrophages. These activated microglia and macrophages play a role in the pathogenesis of SCI.

Upon infiltration of the injury site's epicenter, macrophages will undergo phenotype switching from an M2 phenotype to an M1-like phenotype. The M2 phenotype is associated with anti-inflammatory factors such as IL-10, IL-4, and IL-13 and contributes to wound healing and tissue repair. However, the M1-like phenotype is associated with pro-inflammatory cytokines and reactive oxygen species that contribute to increased damage and inflammation. Factors such as myelin debris, which is formed by the injury at the damage site, has been shown to induce the phenotype shift from M2 to M1. A decreased population of M2 macrophages and an increased population of M1 macrophages is associated with chronic inflammation. Short-term inflammation is important in clearing cell debris from the site of injury, but it is this chronic, long-term inflammation that will lead to further cell death and damage radiating from the site of injury.

== Ageing ==
Ageing is often associated with cognitive impairment and increased propensity for developing neurodegenerative diseases, such as Alzheimer's disease. Elevated inflammatory markers seemed to accelerate the brain ageing process In the aged brain alone, without any evident disease, there are chronically increased levels of pro-inflammatory cytokines and reduced levels of anti-inflammatory cytokines. The homeostatic imbalance between anti-inflammatory and pro-inflammatory cytokines in ageing is one factor that increases the risk for neurodegenerative disease. Additionally, there is an increased number of activated microglia in aged brains, which have increased expression of major histocompatibility complex II (MHC II), ionized calcium binding adaptor-1 (IBA1), CD86, ED1 macrophage antigen, CD4, and leukocyte common antigen. These activated microglia decrease the ability for neurons to undergo long term potentiation (LTP) in the hippocampus and thereby reduce the ability to form memories.

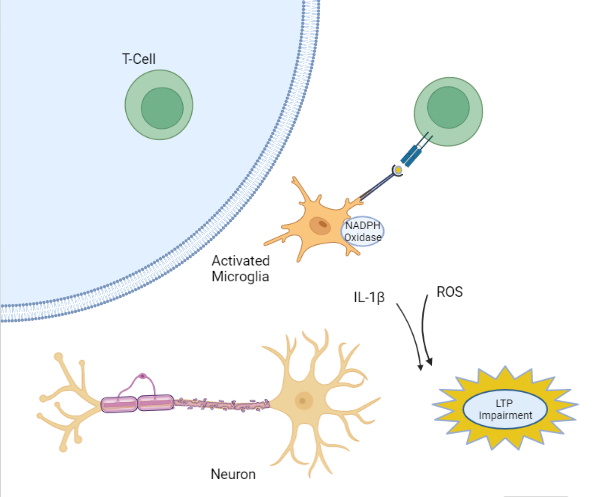
Impairment of neuron LTP by activated microglia (created with BioRender.com)

As one of the major cytokines responsible for maintaining inflammatory balance, IL-6 can also be used as a biological marker to observe the correlation between age and neuroinflammation. The same levels of IL-6 observed in the brain after injury, have also been found in the elderly and indicate the potential for cognitive impairment to develop. The unnecessary upregulation of IL-6 in the elderly population is a result of dysfunctional mediation by glial cells that can lead to the priming of glial cells and result in a more sensitive neuroinflammatory response.

== Role in neurodegenerative disease ==
=== Alzheimer's disease ===
Alzheimer's disease (AD) has historically been characterized by two major hallmarks: neurofibrillary tangles and amyloid-beta plaques. Neurofibrillary tangles are insoluble aggregates of tau proteins, and amyloid-beta plaques are extracellular deposits of the amyloid-beta protein. Current thinking in AD pathology goes beyond these two typical hallmarks to suggest that a significant portion of neurodegeneration in Alzheimer's is due to neuroinflammation. Activated microglia are seen in abundance in post-mortem AD brains. Current thought is that inflammatory cytokine-activated microglia cannot phagocytose amyloid-beta, which may contribute to plaque accumulation as opposed to clearance. Additionally, the inflammatory cytokine IL-1β is upregulated in AD and is associated with decreases of synaptophysin and consequent synaptic loss. Further evidence that inflammation is associated with disease progression in AD is that individuals who take non-steroidal anti-inflammatory drugs (NSAIDs) regularly have been associated with a 67% of protection against the onset of AD (relative to the placebo group) in a four-year follow-up assessment. Elevated inflammatory markers showed an association with accelerated brain aging, which might explain the link to neurodegeneration in AD-related brain regions.

=== Parkinson's disease ===
The leading hypothesis of Parkinson's disease progression includes neuroinflammation as a major component. This hypothesis stipulates that Stage 1 of Parkinson's disease begins in the gut, as evidenced by a large number of cases that begin with constipation. The inflammatory response in the gut may play a role in alpha-synuclein (α-Syn) aggregation and misfolding, a characteristic of Parkinson's disease pathology. If there is a balance between good bacteria and bad bacteria in the gut, the bacteria may remain contained to the gut. However, dysbiosis of good bacteria and bad bacteria may cause a "leaky" gut, creating an inflammatory response. This response aids α-Syn misfolding and transfer across neurons, as the protein works its way up to the CNS. The brainstem is vulnerable to inflammation, which would explain Stage 2, including sleep disturbances and depression. In Stage 3 of the hypothesis, the inflammation affects the substantia nigra, the dopamine producing cells of the brain, beginning the characteristic motor deficits of Parkinson's disease. Stage 4 of Parkinson's disease includes deficits caused by inflammation in key regions of the brain that regulate executive function and memory. As evidence supporting this hypothesis, patients in Stage 3 (motor deficits) that are not experiencing cognitive deficits already show that there is neuroinflammation of the cortex. This suggests that neuroinflammation may be a precursor to the deficits seen in Parkinson's disease.

=== Amyotrophic lateral sclerosis ===
Unlike other neurodegenerative diseases, the exact pathophysiology of amyotrophic lateral sclerosis (ALS) is still far from being fully uncovered. Several hypotheses have been proposed to explain the development and progression of this lethal disease, by which neuroinflammation is one of the above. It is characterised by the activation of microglia and astrocytes, T lymphocyte infiltration, and the production of pro-inflammatory cytokines. Features of neuroinflammation were observed in the brain of living ALS patients, post-mortem CNS samples, and mouse models of ALS. Multiple evidence has described the mechanism of how microglial and astrocyte activation can promote disease progression (reviewed by). Replacement of mSOD1 microglia and astrocytes with the wild-type forms delayed motor neuron (MN) degeneration and extended the lifespan of ALS mice. Infiltration of T cells was reported in both early and late stages of ALS. Among all T cells, CD4^{+} T cells has drawn the most attention by being a neuroprotective agent during MN loss. T regulatory (T_{reg}) cells is also a safeguard against neuroinflammation, demonstrated by the evidence of inverse correlation of the number of T_{reg} cells and disease progression/ severity. Apart from the three phenotypes discussed, peripheral macrophages/ monocytes and the complement system are also suggested to be contributed to disease pathogenesis. Activation and invasion of peripheral monocytes observed in the spinal cord of ALS patients and mice may lead to MN loss. Expression of several complement components are reported to be upregulated in the samples isolated from ALS patients and transgenic rodent models. Further studies are required to elucidate their roles in ALS.

=== Multiple sclerosis ===
Multiple sclerosis is the most common disabling neurological disease of young adults. It is characterized by demyelination and neurodegeneration, which contribute to the common symptoms of cognitive deficits, limb weakness, and fatigue. In multiple sclerosis, inflammatory cytokines disrupt the blood–brain barrier and allow for the migration of peripheral immune cells into the central nervous system. When they have migrated into the central nervous system, B cells and plasma cells produce antibodies against the myelin sheath that insulates neurons, degrading the myelin and slowing conduction in the neurons. Additionally, T cells may enter through the blood–brain barrier, be activated by local antigen presenting cells, and attack the myelin sheath. This has the same effect of degrading the myelin and slowing conduction. As in other neurodegenerative diseases, activated microglia produce inflammatory cytokines that contribute to widespread inflammation. It has been shown that inhibiting microglia decreases the severity of multiple sclerosis.

== Role as therapeutic target ==
=== Drug therapy ===
Because neuroinflammation has been associated with a variety of neurodegenerative diseases, there is increasing interest to determine whether reducing inflammation will reverse neurodegeneration. Inhibiting inflammatory cytokines, such as IL-1β, decreases neuronal loss seen in neurodegenerative diseases. Current treatments for multiple sclerosis include interferon-B, Glatiramer acetate, and Mitoxantrone, which function by reducing or inhibiting T cell activation, but have the side effect of systemic immunosuppression In Alzheimer's disease, the use of non-steroidal anti-inflammatory drugs decreases the risk of developing the disease. Current treatments for Alzheimer's disease include NSAIDs and glucocorticoids. NSAIDs function by blocking conversion of prostaglandin H2 into other prostaglandins (PGs) and thromboxane (TX). Prostoglandins and thromboxane act as inflammatory mediators and increase microvascular permeability.

=== Exercise ===
Exercise is a promising mechanism of prevention and treatment for various diseases characterized by neuroinflammation. Aerobic exercise is used widely to reduce inflammation in the periphery by activating protective systems in the body that stabilize internal environment. Exercise has been shown to decrease proliferation of microglia in the brain, decrease hippocampal expression of immune-related genes and reduce expression of inflammatory cytokines such as TNF-α.

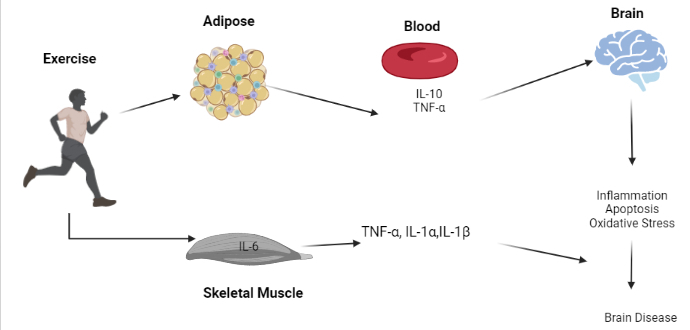
The neuroprotective and anti-inflammatory effects of exercise on cognitive diseases.

Exercise can help protect the mind and body by maintaining the brain's internal environment, focusing on recruiting anti-inflammatory cytokines, and activating cellular processes that proactively protect against damage while also initiating recovery mechanisms. The ability of physical activity to stimulate immune defenses against neuroinflammation-related diseases has been observed in recent clinical studies. The application of various exercises under a range of different conditions resulted in higher neurological metabolism, stronger protection against free radicals, and stronger neuroplasticity against neurological diseases. The resulting increase in brain function was due to the induced change in gene expression, increase in trophic factors, and reduction in pro-inflammatory cytokines.

== See also ==
- NLRP3 inflammasome
- Selnoflast
- Caspase-1
