= Colony stimulating factor 1 receptor =

Protein found in humans

CSF1R
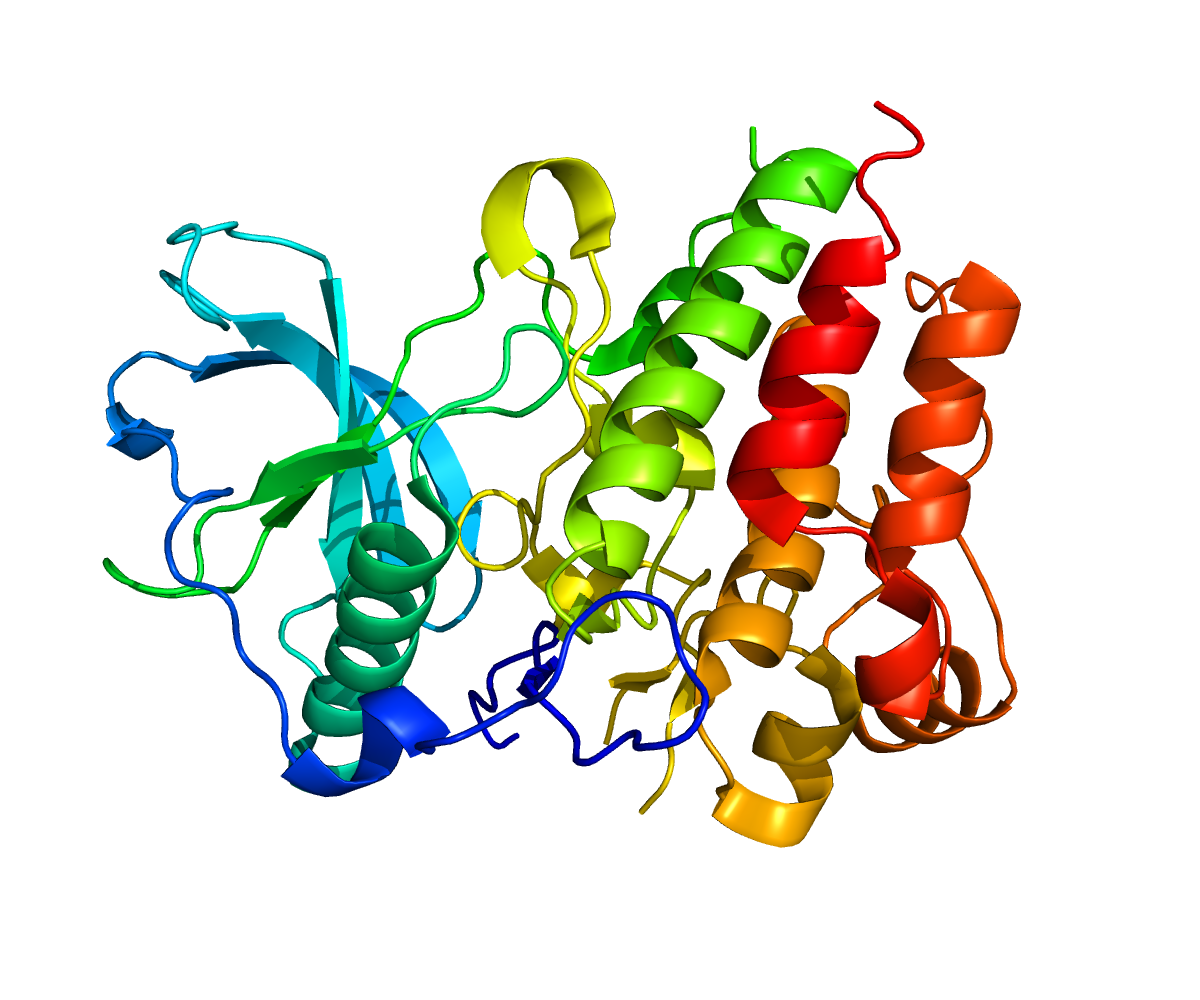

Identifiers
- Aliases: CSF1R, C-FMS, CD115, CSF-1R, CSFR, FIM2, FMS, HDLS, M-CSF-R, colony stimulating factor 1 receptor, BANDDOS, HDLS1
- External IDs: OMIM: 164770; MGI: 1339758; GeneCards: CSF1R
Available structures
PDB	Ortholog search: PDBe RCSB
PDB	List of PDB id codes 2I0V, 2I0Y, 2I1M, 2OGV, 3BEA, 3DPK, 3KRJ, 3KRL, 3LCD, 3LCO, 4DKD, 4HW7, 4LIQ, 4R7H, 4R7I, 4WRL, 4WRM
Enzyme activity
EC #	BRENDA	ExPASy	KEGG	MetaCyc
2.7.10.1	↗	↗	↗	↗

Gene location (Human)
Chr.	Chromosome 5 (human)
Band	5q32	Start	150,053,291 bp
Band	5q32	End	150,113,372 bp

Gene location (Mouse)
Chr.	Chromosome 18 (mouse)
Band	18 E1|18 34.41 cM	Start	61,233,670 bp
Band	18 E1|18 34.41 cM	End	61,265,221 bp
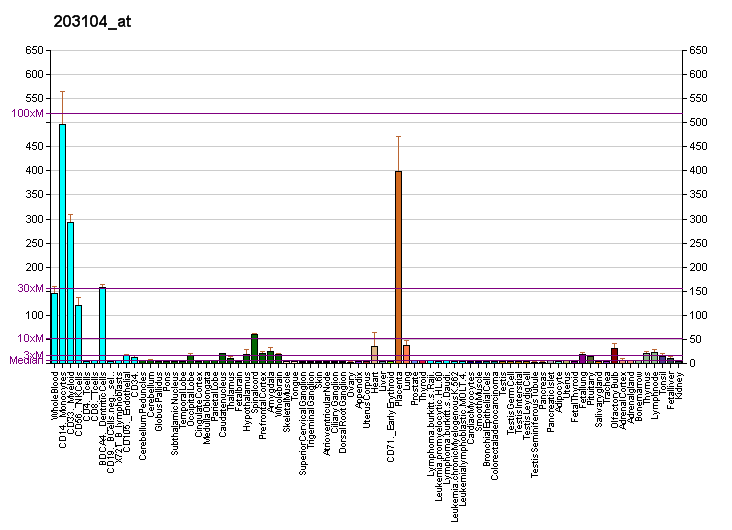
RNA expression pattern
Bgee	Human / Mouse (ortholog); Top expressed in: granulocyte; monocyte; spleen; right coronary artery; placenta; inferior ganglion of vagus nerve; retinal pigment epithelium; gallbladder; appendix; lymph node / Top expressed in: stroma of bone marrow; retinal pigment epithelium; ankle; motor neuron; tibiofemoral joint; internal carotid artery; calvaria; substantia nigra; gastrula; globus pallidus; More reference expression data
BioGPS	More reference expression data
Gene ontology
Molecular function	nucleotide binding; protein tyrosine kinase activity; protein kinase activity; transferase activity; transmembrane receptor protein tyrosine kinase activity; kinase activity; protein homodimerization activity; ATP binding; protein phosphatase binding; macrophage colony-stimulating factor receptor activity; cytokine binding; protein binding; receptor tyrosine kinase; transmembrane signaling receptor activity
Cellular component	integral component of membrane; integral component of plasma membrane; membrane; cell surface; CSF1-CSF1R complex; nucleoplasm; plasma membrane; intracellular membrane-bounded organelle; cytoplasm; receptor complex
Biological process	negative regulation of cell population proliferation; transmembrane receptor protein tyrosine kinase signaling pathway; positive regulation of protein serine/threonine kinase activity; mammary gland duct morphogenesis; positive regulation of cell motility; macrophage colony-stimulating factor signaling pathway; phosphatidylinositol-mediated signaling; negative regulation of apoptotic process; positive regulation of ERK1 and ERK2 cascade; signal transduction; axon guidance; multicellular organism development; monocyte differentiation; macrophage differentiation; ruffle organization; positive regulation of cell migration; cellular response to cytokine stimulus; protein autophosphorylation; peptidyl-tyrosine phosphorylation; olfactory bulb development; regulation of bone resorption; phosphatidylinositol metabolic process; protein phosphorylation; positive regulation of protein tyrosine kinase activity; cell-cell junction maintenance; osteoclast differentiation; innate immune response; regulation of actin cytoskeleton reorganization; immune system process; inflammatory response; positive regulation of protein phosphorylation; forebrain neuron differentiation; phosphorylation; cellular response to macrophage colony-stimulating factor stimulus; positive regulation of cell population proliferation; regulation of cell shape; cell population proliferation; positive regulation of tyrosine phosphorylation of STAT protein; cytokine-mediated signaling pathway; hemopoiesis; negative regulation of signal transduction; cell differentiation; hematopoietic progenitor cell differentiation; positive regulation of MAPK cascade; response to ischemia; microglial cell proliferation; positive regulation by host of viral process
Sources:Amigo / QuickGO
Orthologs
Databases	NCBI: entry; OMA: entry
Species	Human	Mouse
Entrez	1436	12978
Ensembl	ENSG00000182578	ENSMUSG00000024621
UniProt	P07333	P09581
RefSeq (mRNA)	NM_001288705; NM_005211; NM_001349736; NM_001375320; NM_001375321	NM_001037859; NM_007779
RefSeq (protein)	NP_001275634; NP_005202; NP_001336665; NP_001362249; NP_001362250	NP_001032948
Location (UCSC)	Chr 5: 150.05 – 150.11 Mb	Chr 18: 61.23 – 61.27 Mb
PubMed search
- Wikidata
View/Edit Human	View/Edit Mouse

Colony stimulating factor 1 receptor (CSF1R), also known as macrophage colony-stimulating factor receptor (M-CSFR), and CD115 (Cluster of Differentiation 115), is a cell-surface protein encoded by the human CSF1R gene (known also as c-FMS). CSF1R is a receptor that can be activated by two ligands: colony stimulating factor 1 (CSF-1) and interleukin-34 (IL-34). CSF1R is highly expressed in myeloid cells, and CSF1R signaling is necessary for the survival, proliferation, and differentiation of many myeloid cell types in vivo and in vitro. CSF1R signaling is involved in many diseases and is targeted in therapies for cancer, neurodegeneration, and inflammatory bone diseases.

== Gene ==
In the human genome, the CSF1R gene is located on chromosome 5 (5q32), and in mice the Csf1r gene is located on chromosome 18 (18D). CSF1R is 60.002 kilobases (kbs) in length. Hematopoietic stem cells express CSF1R at low levels, but CSF1R is highly expressed in more differentiated myeloid cell types such as monocytes, macrophages, osteoclasts, myeloid dendritic cells, microglia, and Paneth cells. CSF1R expression is controlled by two alternative promoters that are active in specific tissue types. Exon 1 of CSF1R is specifically transcribed in trophoblastic cells whereas exon 2 is specifically transcribed in macrophages. Activation of CSF1R transcription is regulated by several transcription factors including Ets and PU.1. Macrophage expression of the CSF1R gene is regulated by the promoter upstream of exon 2 and another highly conserved region termed the fms intronic regulatory element (FIRE). The FIRE is a 250-bp region in intron 2 that regulates transcript elongation during transcription of CSF1R in macrophages. Specific deletion of FIRE prevents differentiation of only specific macrophage types such as brain microglia and macrophages in the skin, kidney, heart, and peritoneum whereas deletion of the entire mouse Csf1r gene widely prevents macrophage differentiation, causing profound developmental defects. Additionally, the first intron of the CSF1R gene contains a transcriptionally inactive ribosomal protein L7 processed pseudogene, oriented in the opposite direction to the CSF1R gene.

== Protein ==
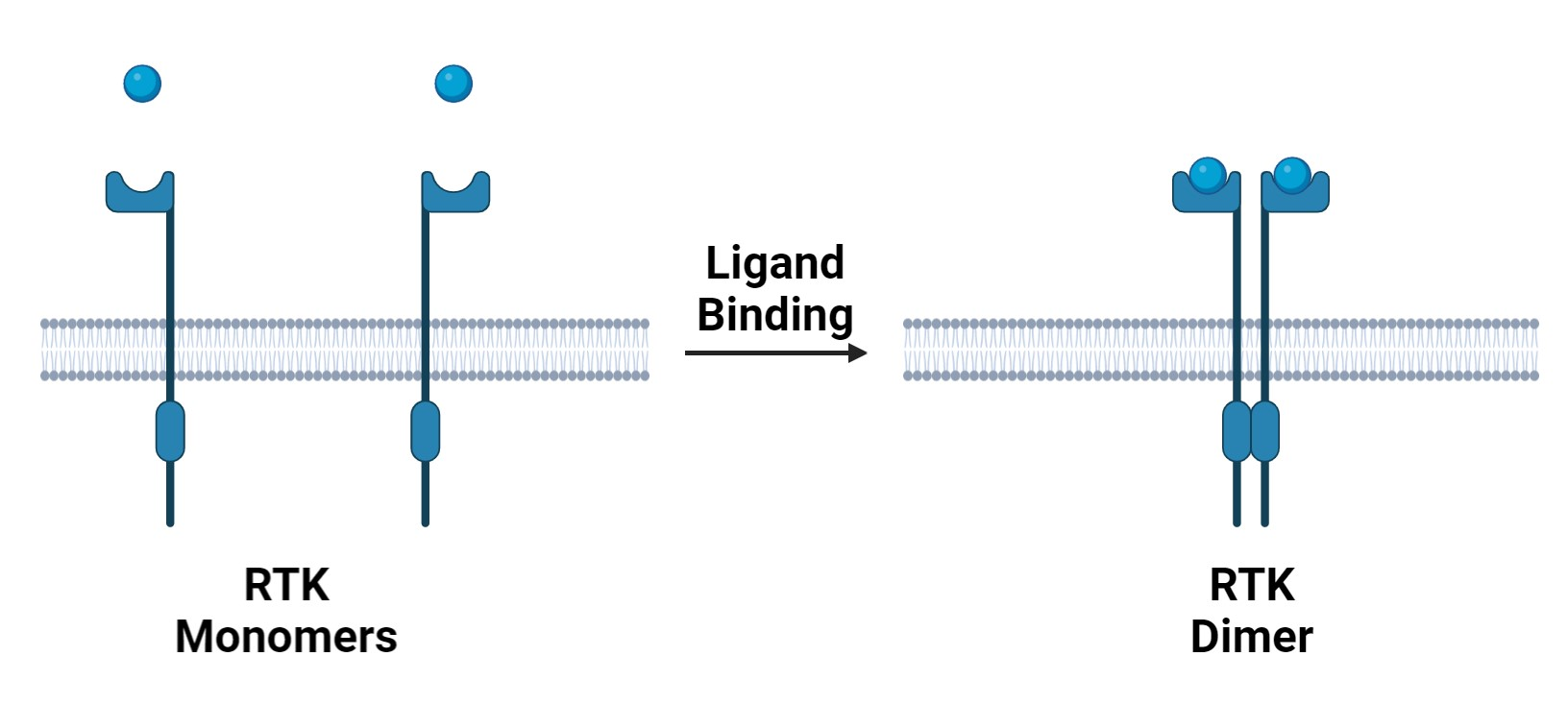
Schematic showing how ligand binding to receptor tyrosine kinases (RTKs) such as CSF1R promotes receptor dimerization which is important for receptor signaling.

CSF1R, the protein encoded by the CSF1R gene is a tyrosine kinase transmembrane receptor and member of the CSF1/PDGF receptor family of tyrosine-protein kinases. CSF1R has 972 amino acids, is predicted to have a molecular weight of 107.984 kilodaltons, and is composed of an extracellular and a cytoplasmic domain. The extracellular domain has 3 N-terminal immunoglobulin (Ig) domains (D1-D3) which bind ligand, 2 Ig domains (D4-D5) which stabilize the ligand, a linker region, and a single-pass transmembrane helix. The cytoplasmic domain has a juxtamembrane domain and tyrosine kinase domain that is interrupted by a kinase insert domain. At rest, the juxtamembrane domain of CSF1R enters an autoinhibitory position to prevent signaling of the CSF1R cytosolic domain. Upon binding of ligand to extracellular Ig domains, CSF1R dimerizes noncovalently and autophosphorylates several tyrosine residues. This first wave of CSF1R tyrosine phosphorylation creates phosphotyrosine-binding domains to which effector proteins can bind and initiate various cellular responses. Many proteins become tyrosine phosphorylated in response to CSF1R signaling (Table 1) including p85, Cbl, and Gab3 which are important for survival, differentiation, chemotaxis, and actin cytoskeleton of myeloid cells. The first wave of tyrosine phosphorylation also leads to the covalent dimerization of CSF1R via disulfide bonds. Covalent CSF1R dimerization is important for a series of modifications to CSF1R itself including a second wave of tyrosine phosphorylation, serine phosphorylation, ubiquitination, and eventually endocytosis which terminates signaling by trafficking the ligand-CSF1R complex to the lysosome for degradation. Colony stimulating factor 1 (CSF-1) and interleukin-34 (IL-34) are both CSF1R ligands. Both ligands regulate myeloid cell survival, proliferation, and differentiation, but CSF-1 and IL-34 differ in their structure, distribution in the body, and the specific cellular signaling cascades triggered upon binding to CSF1R.

Table 1. CSF-1R signaling proteins in myeloid cells
Protein	Full protein name; function
SFK	Src family tyrosine kinases
Grb2	Adaptor
Mona	Monocyte adaptor; adaptor
Socs1	Suppressor of cytokine signaling-1; adaptor
PLCγ	Phospholipase C-γ
p85 PI3K	Regulatory subunit of PI3K
Cbl	Casitas B lineage; ubiquitin ligase, adaptor
FMIP	FMS-interacting protein; function unknown
PP2A	Protein phosphatase 2A; serine/threonine phosphatase
Pyk2	Proline-rich and Ca2C-activated tyrosine kinase
Paxilin	Focal complex adaptor
PTPφ	PTP for phosphopaxillin
MAYP/PSTPIP2	Macrophage actin-associated and tyrosine-phosphorylated protein; actin bundling
Iba1	Ionized Ca2C-binding adaptor protein 1; actin bundling
Gab2	Grb2-associated binder-2; Adaptor
Gab3	Grb2-associated binder-3; adaptor
SHIP1	SH2-domain-containing polyinositol phosphatase-1
SHP1	SH2-domain-containing phosphatase-1; PTP
SHP2	SH2-domain-containing phosphatase-2; PTP
PKC-δ	Protein kinase C-d
Pkare	PKA-related gene (Pkare); protein kinase
MysPDZ	110-kDa myosin XVIIIA
STAT1, STAT3, STAT5	Signal transducers and activators of transcription-1, -2, -3; transcription factors
Dok1, Dok2, Dok3	Downstream of kinase-1, -2, -3; adaptors
Vav	Rho family guanine-nucleotide-exchange factor
BLIMP-1	B-lymphocyte-induced maturation protein-1; transcriptional repressor

== Function ==
=== Osteoclasts ===
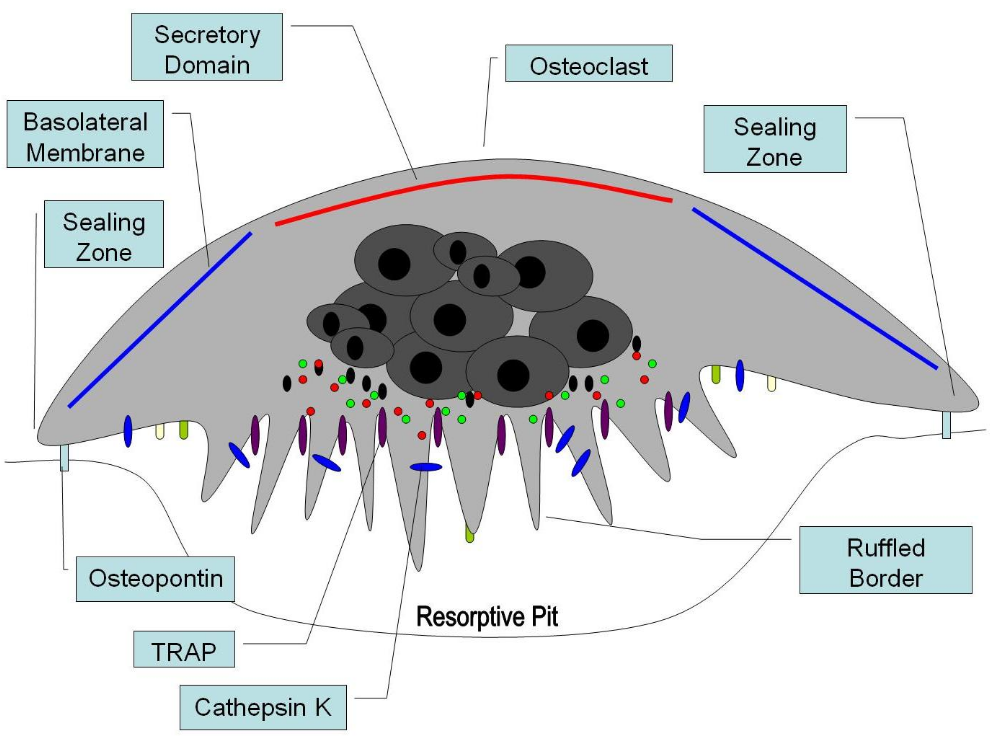
Illustrated cross-section of an activated osteoclast.

Osteoclast are multi-nucleated cells that absorb and remove bone which is critical for growth of new bones and maintenance of bone strength. Osteoclasts are critical for the bone remodeling cycle which is achieved by the building of bone by osteoblasts, reabsorption by osteoclasts, and remodeling by osteoblasts. Osteoclasts precursor cells and mature osteoclast require stimulation of CSF1R for survival. Blockage of CSF1R signaling prevents osteoclast precursor cells from proliferating, maturing, and fusing into multi-nucleated cells. Stimulation of CSF1R promotes osteoclastogenesis (differentiation of monocytes into osteoclasts). CSF1R signaling in osteoclasts precursors promotes survival by upregulation of the Bcl-X(L) protein, an inhibitor of pro-apoptotic caspase-9. CSF1R signaling in mature osteoclasts promotes survival by stimulating mTOR/S6 kinase and the Na/HCO3 co-transporter, NBCn1. CSF1R signaling also directly regulates osteoclast function. Osteoclasts migrate along the bone surface, then adhere to the bone to degrade and reabsorb the bone matrix. CSF1R signaling positively regulates this behavior, increasing osteoclast chemotaxis and bone reabsorption.

=== Monocytes and macrophages ===
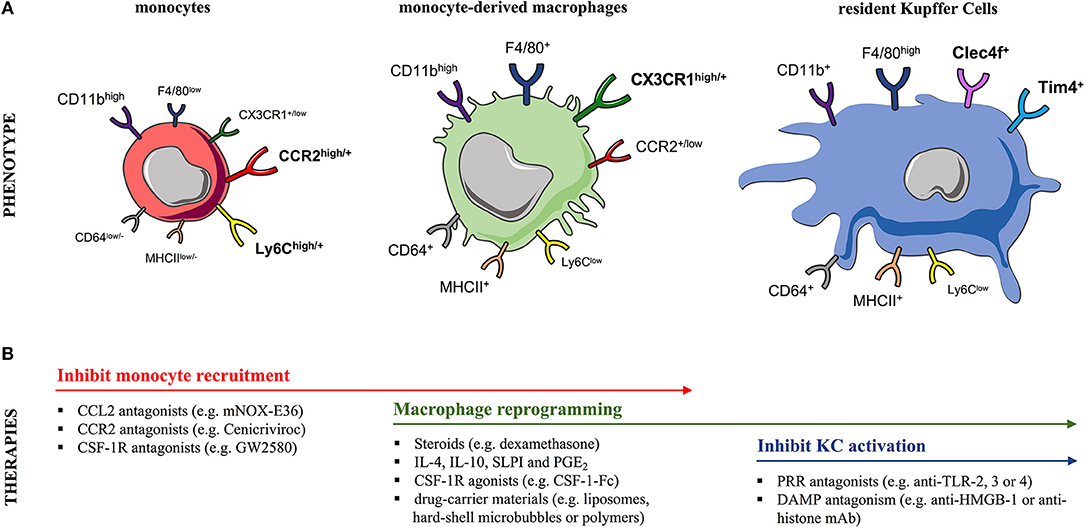
Illustrated schematic of monocytes, monocyte-derived macrophages, and liver-resident Kupffer cells.

Monocytes and macrophages are mononuclear phagocytes. Monocytes circulate in the blood and are capable of differentiating into macrophages or dendritic cells, and macrophages are terminally differentiated tissue-resident cells. CSF1R signaling is necessary for differentiation of microglia and Langerhans cells which are derived from yolk sac progenitor cells with high expression of CSF1R. CSF1R signaling is only partially required for other tissue macrophages, and it is not necessary for monocytopoiesis (production of monocytes and macrophages) from hematopoietic stem cells. Macrophages of thymus and lymph nodes are almost completely independent of CSF1R signaling. In macrophages whose survival is fully or partially dependent on CSF1R signaling, CSF1R promotes survival by activating PI3K. CSF1R signaling also regulates macrophage function. One function of CSF1R signaling is to promote tissue protection and healing following damage. Damage to the kidney causes upregulation of CSF-1 and CSF1R in tubular epithelial cells. This promotes proliferation and survival of injured tubular epithelial cells and promotes anti-inflammatory phenotypes in resident macrophage to promote kidney healing. Lastly, activation of CSF1R is a strong chemokinetic signal, inducing macrophage polarization and chemotaxis towards the source of CSF1R ligand. This macrophage response requires rapid morphological changes which is achieved by remodeling of the actin cytoskeleton via the Src/ Pyk2 and PI3K signaling pathways.

=== Microglia ===
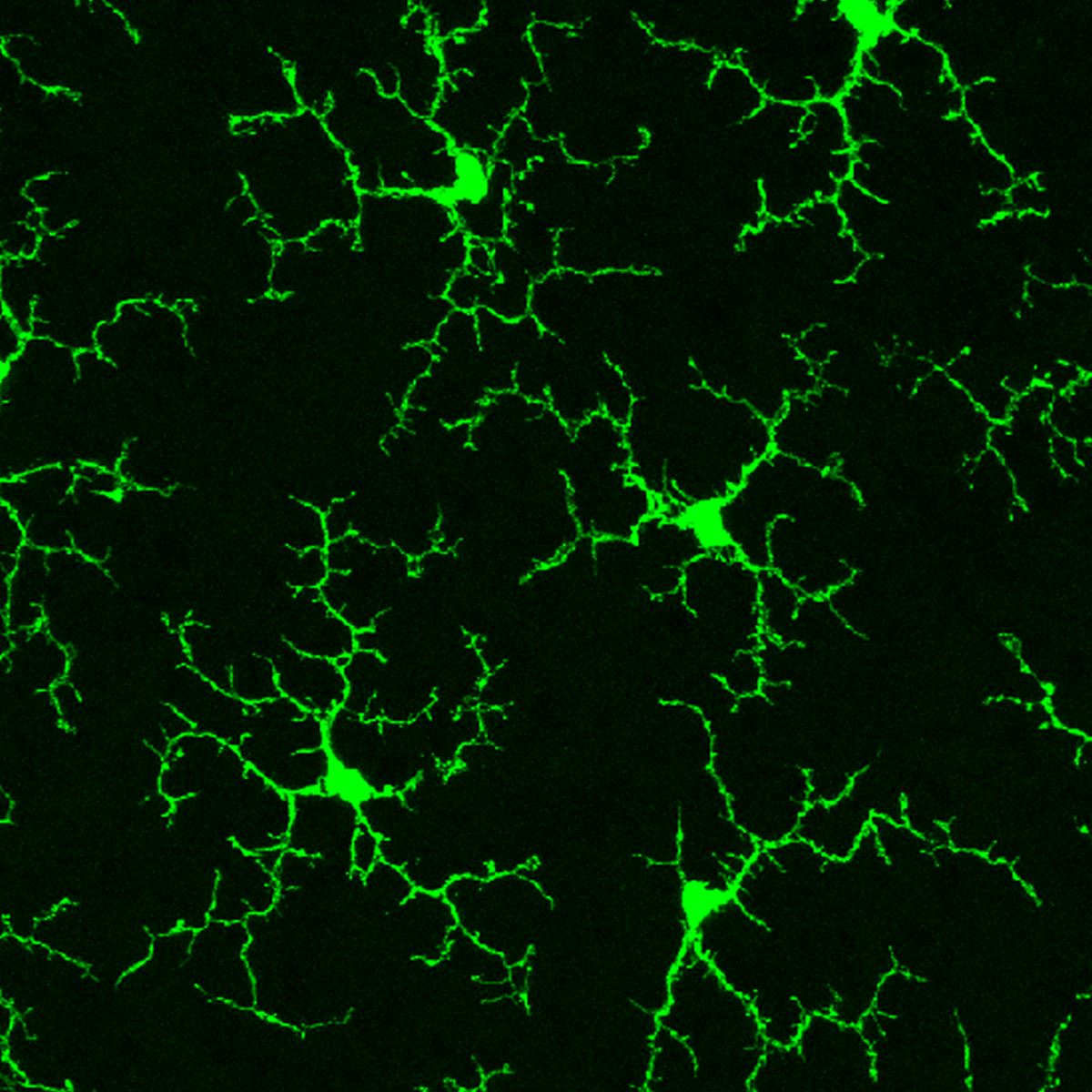
Immunofluorescence staining of homeostatic microglia in a healthy adult mouse retina.

Microglia are the tissue-resident phagocytes of the central nervous system. CSF1R signaling promotes migration of primitive microglia precursor cells from the embryonic yolk sac to the developing brain prior to formation of the blood-brain-barrier. In perinatal development, microglia are instrumental in synaptic pruning, a process in which microglia phagocytose weak and inactive synapses via binding of microglial complement receptor 3 (CR3) (complex of CD11b and CD18) to synapse-bound iC3b. Csf1r loss-of-function inhibits synaptic pruning and leads to excessive non-functional synapses in the brain. In adulthood, CSF1R is required for the proliferation and survival of microglia. Inhibition of CSF1R signaling in adulthood causes near-complete (>99%) depletion (death) of brain microglia, however reversal of CSF1R inhibition stimulates remaining microglia to proliferate and repopulate microglia-free niches in the brain. Production of CSF1R ligands CSF-1 and IL-34 is increased in the brain following injury or viral infection, which directs microglia to proliferate and execute immune responses.

=== Neural progenitor cells ===
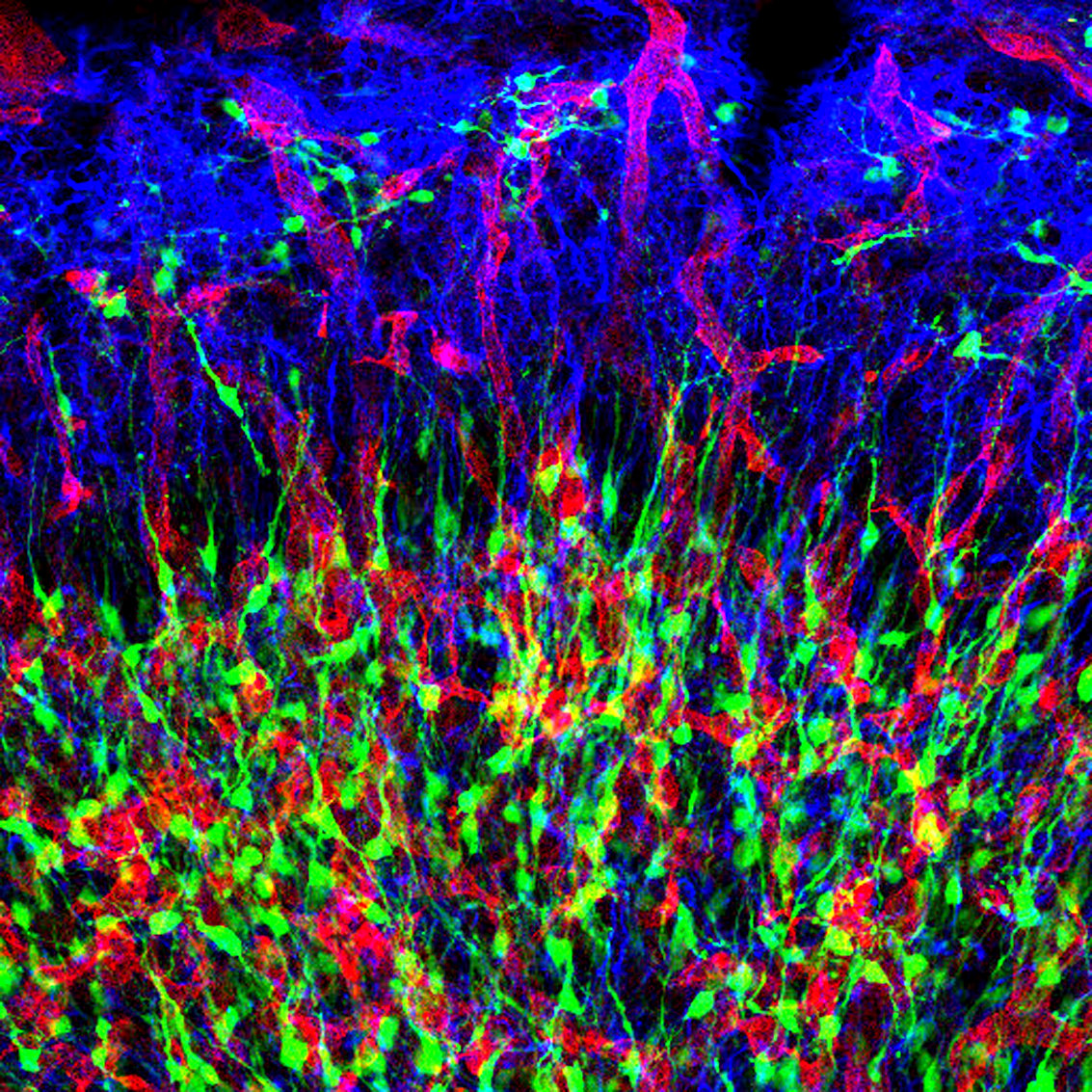
Immunofluorescence staining of neural progenitor cells (green), vasculature (red), and astrocytes (blue).

CSF1R signaling has been found to play important roles in non-myeloid cells such as neural progenitor cells, multipotent cells that are able to self-renew or terminally differentiate into neurons, astrocytes and oligodendrocytes. Mice with Csf1r loss-of-function have a significantly more neural progenitor cells in generative zones and fewer matured neurons in Forebrainforebrain laminae due to failure of progenitor cell maturation and radial migration. These phenotypes were also seen in animals with Csf1r conditional knock-out specifically in neural progenitor cells, suggesting that CSF1R signaling by neural progenitor cells is important for maturation of certain neurons. Studies using cultured neural progenitor cells also show that CSF1R signaling stimulates neural progenitor cells maturation.

=== Germline cells ===
CSF1R is expressed in oocytes, the trophoblast, and fertilized embryos prior to implantation in the uterus. Studies using early mouse embryos in vitro have shown that activation of CSF1R stimulates formation of the blastocyst cavity and enhances the number of trophoblast cells. Csf1r loss-of-function mice exhibit several reproductive system abnormalities in the estrous cycle and ovulation rates as well as reduced antral follicles and ovarian macrophages. It is not clear whether ovulation dysfunction in Csf1r loss-of-function mice is due to loss of the protective effects of ovarian macrophages or loss of CSF1R signaling in oocytes themselves.

== Clinical significance ==
=== Bone disease ===
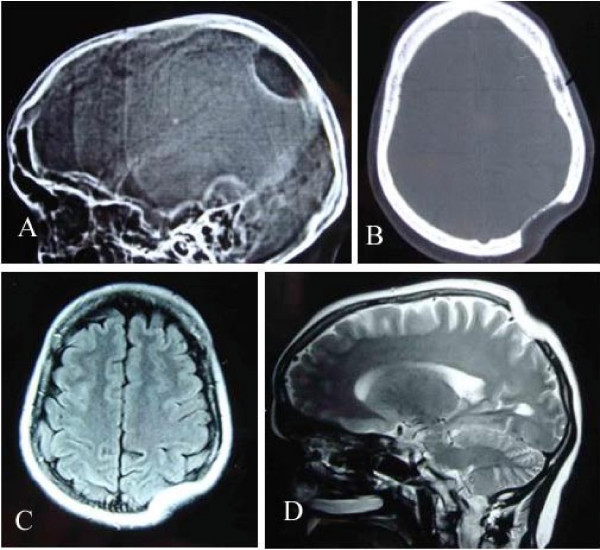
X-ray (A), CT scan (B) and MRI (C, D) show osteolysis of bone in the skull of an individual with Gorham-Stout disease.

Bone remodeling is regulated by mutual cross-regulation between osteoclasts and osteoblasts. As a result, the dysfunction of CSF1R signaling directly affects the reabsorption (osteoclasts) and indirectly affects bone deposition (osteoblasts). In inflammatory arthritis conditions such as rheumatoid arthritis, psoriatic arthritis, and Crohn's disease, proinflammatory cytokine TNF-α is secreted by synovial macrophages which stimulates stromal cells and osteoblasts to produce CSF-1. Increased CSF-1 promotes proliferation of osteoclasts and osteoclast precursors and increases osteoclast bone reabsorption. This pathogenic increase in osteoclast activity causes abnormal bone loss or osteolysis. In animal models of rheumatoid arthritis, administration of CSF-1 increases the severity of disease whereas Csf1r loss-of-function reduces inflammation and joint erosion. In a rare bone disease called Gorham‐Stout disease, elevated production of CSF-1 by lymphatic endothelial cells similarly produces excessive osteoclastogenesis and osteolysis. Additionally, postmenopausal loss of estrogen has also been found to impact CSF1R signaling and cause osteoporosis. Estrogen deficiency causes osteoporosis by upregulating production of TNF-α by activated T cells. As in inflammatory arthritis, TNF-α stimulates stromal cells to produce CSF-1 which increases CSF1R signaling in osteoclasts.

=== Cancer ===
Schematic of tumor microenvironment of breast cancer. Cancers secrete many signals including colony stimulating factor which activates TAM CSF1R and promotes tumor growth and survival.

Tumor-associated macrophages (TAMs) react to early stage cancers with anti-inflammatory immune responses that support tumor survival at the expense of healthy tissue. Tumor infiltration by CSF1R-expressing TAMs yields a negative prognosis and is correlated with poor survival rates for individuals with lymphoma and solid tumors. The tumor microenvironment often produces high levels of CSF-1, creating a positive feedback loop in which the tumor stimulates survival of TAMs and TAMs promote tumor survival and growth. Thus, CSF1R signaling in TAMs is associated tumor survival, angiogenesis, therapy resistance, and metastasis. Production of CSF-1 by brain tumors called glioblastomas causes microglia (brain-resident macrophages) to exhibit immunosuppressive, tumor-permissive phenotypes. CSF1R inhibition in mouse glioblastoma models is beneficial and improves survival by inhibiting tumor-promoting functions of microglia. In a murine model of metastatic renal cell carcinoma, the IL-34/CSF1R axis can drive the migration and accumulation of monocyte-derived tumor-associated macrophages in the tumor microenvironment and consequently induces immunosuppression and nonfunctional vasculature, two key features of therapy resistance. Blocking CSF1R with pexidartinib reduces IL-34 driven MD-TAMs accumulation, improves vascular integrity, and when combined with sunitinib or anti PD-1 therapy, limits metastatic growth better than monotherapies in treated mice. Mouse models of breast cancer also show that Csf1r loss-of-function delays TAM infiltration and metastasis. Because anti-cancer macrophages and microglia rely on GM-CSF and IFN-γ signaling instead CSF-1, inhibition of CSF1R signaling has been posited as a therapeutic target in cancer to preferentially deplete tumor-permissive TAMs. Additionally, mutations in CSF1R gene itself are associated with certain cancers such as chronic myelomonocytic leukemia and type M4 acute myeloblastic leukemia.

=== Neurological disorders ===
==== Adult-onset leukoencephalopathy ====
Because of the importance of the CSF1R gene in myeloid cell survival, maturation, and function, loss-of-function in both inherited copies of the CSF1R gene causes postnatal mortality. Heterozygous mutations in the CSF1R gene prevent downstream CSF1R signaling and cause an autosomal dominant neurodegenerative disease called adult-onset leukoencephalopathy, which is characterized by dementia, executive dysfunction, and seizures. Partial loss of CSF1R in adult-onset leukoencephalopathy causes microglia to exhibit morphological and functional deficits (impaired cytokine production and phagocytosis) which is associated with axonal damage, demyelination, and neuronal loss. Signaling by a DAP12-TREM2 complex in microglia is downstream of CSF1R signaling and is needed for microglia phagocytosis of cellular debris and maintenance of brain homeostasis. TREM2 deficiency in cultured myeloid cells prevents stimulation of proliferation by treatment with CSF-1. Similarities between Nasu-Hakola disease (caused by mutations in either DAP12 or TREM2) and adult-onset leukoencephalopathy suggest partial loss of microglia CSF1R signaling promotes neurodegeneration. Defects in neurogenesis and neuronal survival are also seen in adult-onset leukoencephalopathy due to impaired CSF1R signaling in neural progenitor cells.

==== Other brain diseases and disorders ====
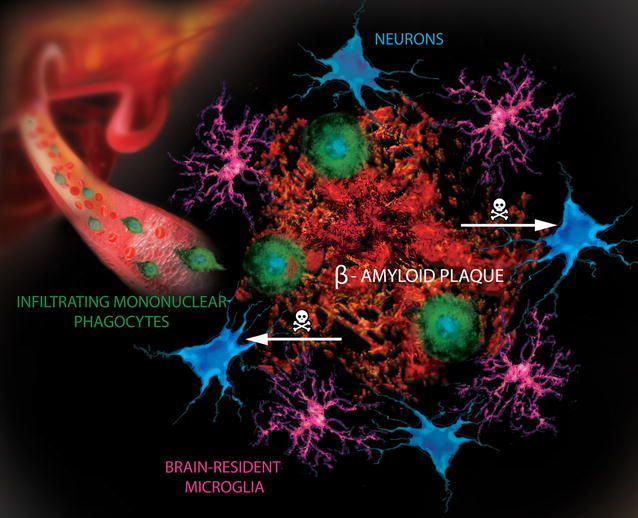
Schematic of brain microglia and infiltrating peripheral macrophages mounting immune responses against β-amyloid plaque.

CSF1R signaling is involved in several diseases and disorders of the central nervous system. Research using animal models of epilepsy (kainic acid-induced seizures) suggests that CSF1 signaling during seizures protects neurons by activating neuronal CREB signaling. CSF1R agonism during seizures increases neuronal survival whereas neuron-specific Csf1r loss-of-function worsens kainic acid excitotoxicity, suggesting CSF1R signaling in neurons directly protects against seizure-related neuronal damage. Although CSF1R signaling is beneficial in certain contexts, it is detrimental in diseases where microglia drive tissue damage. In Charcot-Marie-Tooth disease type 1, CSF-1 secretion from endoneurial cells stimulates proliferation and activation of macrophages and microglia that cause demyelination. Likewise in multiple sclerosis, CSF1R signaling supports the survival of inflammatory microglia which promote demyelination. CSF1R inhibition prophylactically reduces demyelination in the experimental autoimmune encephalomyelitis animal model. The role of CSF1R signaling in Alzheimer's disease is more complicated because microglia both protect and damage the brain in response to Alzheimer's disease pathology. CSF-1 stimulates primary cultured human microglia to phagocytose toxic Aβ_{1–42} peptides. Microglia also initiate TREM2-dependent immune responses to amyloid plaques which protects neurons. However, Alzheimer's disease microglia also excessively secrete inflammatory cytokines and prune synapses promoting synapse loss, neuronal death, and cognitive impairment. Both CSF1R stimulation and inhibition improves cognitive function in Alzheimer's disease models. Thus, microglia seem to have both protective and neurotoxic functions during Alzheimer's disease neurodegeneration. Similar findings have been reported in lesion studies of the mouse brain, which showed that inhibition of CSF1R after lesioning improves recovery but inhibition during lesioning worsens recovery. CSF1R-targeting therapies for neurological disorders may impact both detrimental and beneficial microglia functions.

== Therapeutics ==
Chemical structure of Pexidartinib (PLX3397), an FDA-approved small molecule inhibitor of CSF1R.

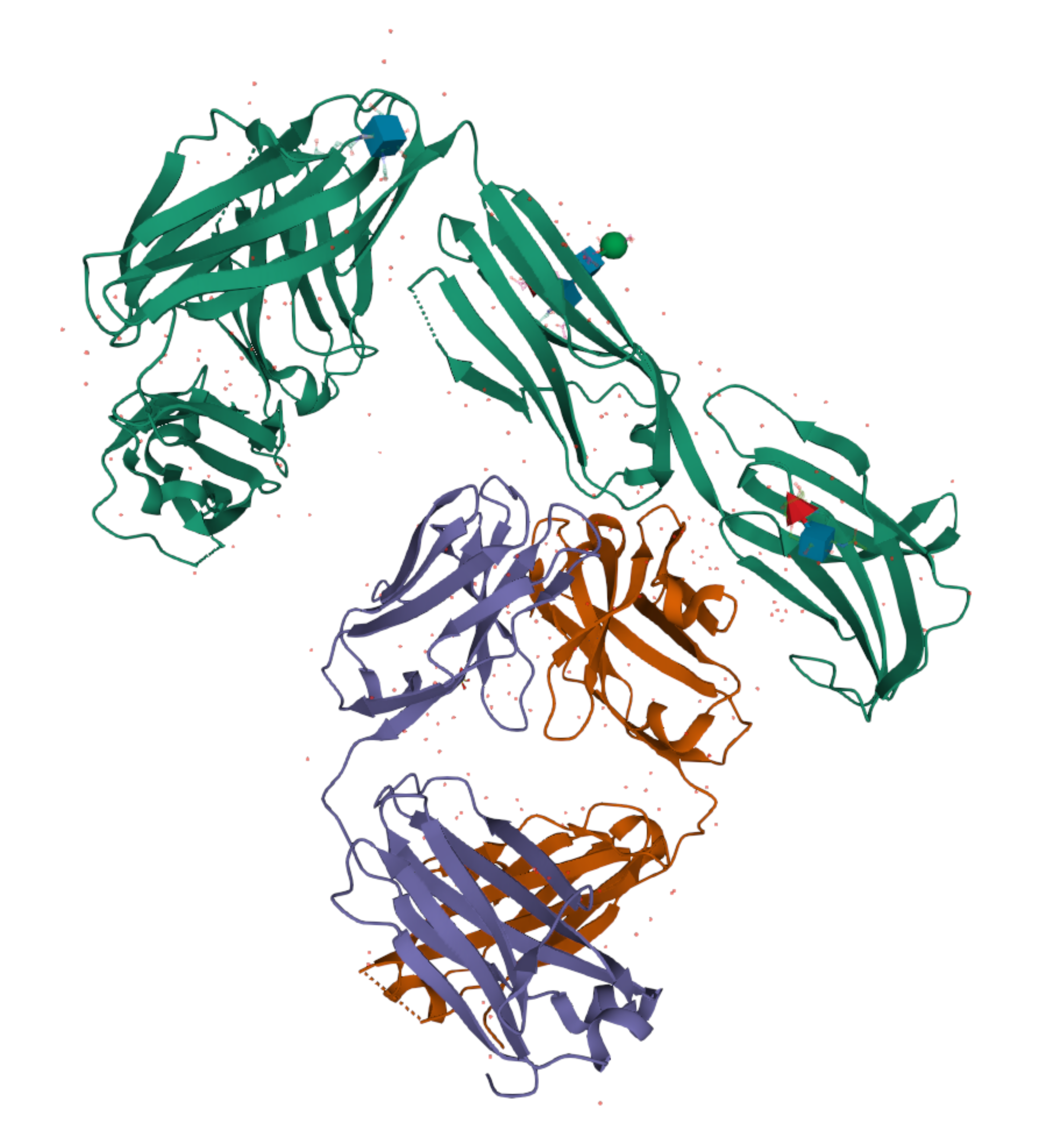
Structure of monoclonal antibody Emactuzumab light and heavy chain complexed with CSF1R.

Because TAM CSF1R signaling is tumor-permissive and can cause tumor treatment-resistance, CSF1R signaling is a promising therapeutic target in the treatment of cancer. Several studies have investigated the efficacy of CSF1R inhibitor as a monotherapy and as a combination therapy in refractory and metastatic cancers. Several small molecule inhibitors and monoclonal antibodies targeting CSF1R are in clinical development for cancer therapy (Table 2). Pexidartinib (PLX3397) is a small molecule inhibitor tyrosine of CSFR (as well as cKIT, FLT3, and VEGFR) with the most clinical development so far. Several completed and concurrent clinical trials have tested the efficacy and safety of Pexidartinib as a monotherapy for c-kit-mutated melanoma, prostate cancer, glioblastoma, classical Hodgkin lymphoma, neurofibroma, sarcoma, and leukemias. In 2019, Pexidartinib was FDA-approved for treatment of diffuse-type tenosynovial giant cell tumors, a non-malignant tumor that develops from synovial tissue lining the joints.

Table 2. CSF1R-targeted therapies in clinical development
Drug name	Form	Targets	Clinical trial diseases
Pexidartinib (PLX3397)	Small molecule	CSF1R, c-KIT, VEGFR, and Flt3	Autoimmune diseases, Alzheimer's disease, Leukemia, acral melanoma, mucosal melanoma
Imatinib	Small molecule	CSF1R, ABL, c-KIT, and PDGFR-β	Osteoporosis, osteolysis, chronic myeloid leukemia (CML), breast cancer
PLX5622	Small molecule	CSF1R	Rheumatoid arthritis, cancer, neuropathic pain, Alzheimer's disease
Sotuletinib (BLZ945)	Small molecule	CSF1R, c-KIT, PDGFRβ, and Flt3	Solid tumors, amyotrophic lateral sclerosis
GW2580	Small molecule	CSF1R	Arthritis, osteoporosis, cancer
Ki20227	Small molecule	CSF1R, VEGFR2, c-KIT, and PDGFRβ	Osteolysis, breast cancer
Edicotinib (JNJ-40346527)	Small molecule	CSF1R, c-KIT, and Flt3	Alzheimer's disease, cHL, rheumatoid arthritis, neurodegenerative diseases
Emactuzumab (RG7155)	Monoclonal antibody	CSF1R	Solid tumors
IMC-CS4 (LY3022855)	Monoclonal antibody	CSF1R	Solid tumors, breast cancer, prostate cancer
AMG820	Monoclonal antibody	CSF1R	Solid tumors

  - Pimicotinib

=== Safety of CSF1R inhibition ===
The safety of CSF1R inhibitors has been extensively characterized in clinical trials for the different small molecules and monoclonal antibodies in Table 2. In some studies, CSF1R inhibitors were not found to have dose-limiting toxicity while other studies did observe toxicity at high doses and have defined a maximum tolerated dose. Across multiple studies, the most frequent adverse effects included fatigue, elevated liver enzymes (creatine kinase, lactate dehydrogenase, aspartate aminotransferase, alanine transaminase), edema, nausea, lacrimation, and reduced appetite, but no signs of liver toxicity were found. There are some differences in the side effects of monoclonal antibody compared to small molecule CSF1R inhibitors. Edema was more common with monoclonal antibody treatment compared to small molecules, suggesting that immune response to monoclonal antibodies may drive some side effects. Additionally, some small molecule inhibitors are not specific for CSF1R, and off-target effects could explain observed side effects. For example, Pexidartinib treatment was found to change hair color, presumably by its impact on KIT kinase. Overall, CSF1R inhibitors have favorable safety profiles with limited toxicity.

== Controversy ==
CSF1R inhibitors such as PLX5622 are widely used to study the role of microglia in mouse preclinical models of Alzheimer's disease, stroke, traumatic brain injury, and aging. PLX5622 is typically used for microglia research because PLX5622 has higher brain bioavailability and CSF1R-specificity compared to other CSF1R inhibitors such as PLX3397. In 2020, researchers David Hume (University of Queensland) and Kim Green (UCI) published a letter in the academic journal PNAS defending the use small molecule CSF1R inhibitors to study microglia in brain disease. This letter was in response to a primary research paper published in PNAS by lead correspondent Eleftherios Paschalis (HMS) and others which provided evidence that microglia research using PLX5622 is confounded by CSF1R inhibition in peripheral macrophages. Paschalis and colleagues published a subsequent letter in PNAS defending the findings of their published research.

== Interactions ==
Colony stimulating factor 1 receptor has been shown to interact with:

- Cbl gene,
- FYN,
- Grb2,
- Suppressor of cytokine signaling 1, This receptor is also linked with the cells of MPS.

== See also ==
- Cluster of differentiation
- Mouse models of breast cancer metastasis
- Pimicotinib
