= Emactuzumab =

Monoclonal antibody

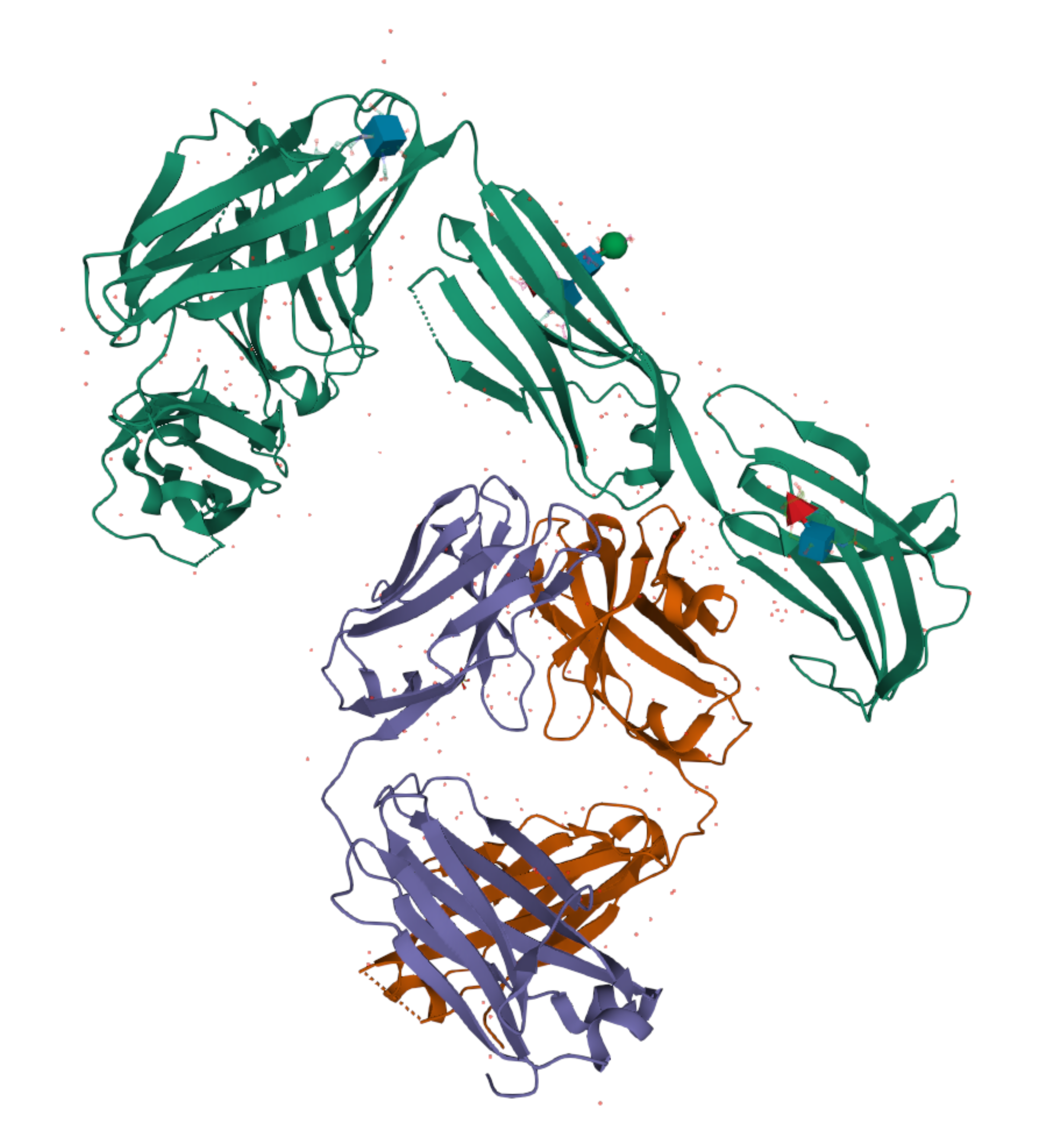
- Emactuzumab light (purple) and heavy (orange) chains complexed with CSF-1R (green)

Monoclonal antibody
- Type: Whole antibody
- Source: Humanized (from mouse)
- Target: CSF1R

Clinical data
- Other names: RG7155, RO5509554
- Routes of administration: intravenous infusion
- ATC code: none

Pharmacokinetic data
- Elimination half-life: 1.5 - 9 days

Identifiers
- CAS Number: 1448221-67-7
- DrugBank: DB14905
- UNII: 6FY6EI1X8R
- KEGG: D11234

Chemical and physical data
- Formula: C_{6398}H_{9908}N_{1704}O_{2020}S_{44}
- Molar mass: 144430.19 g·mol^{−1}

Emactuzumab (RG-7155) is a humanized monoclonal antibody directed against colony stimulating factor 1 receptor (CSF-1R) expressed on macrophages and has demonstrated a profound antitumor effect through interference with the CSF-1/CSF-1R axis, along with a manageable safety profile in patients with diffuse-type tenosynovial giant cell tumors (d-TGCT).

== History ==
Emactuzumab was originally developed by Roche/Genentech. In August 2020, Celleron Therapeutics signed a deal to acquire an exclusive worldwide license for the asset. In November 2020, Celleron Therapeutics incorporated a subsidiary, SynOx Therapeutics, to focus on the development, registration, and commercialisation of emactuzumab.

== Mechanism of action ==
Emactuzumab is a humanized monoclonal antibody directed against the tyrosine kinase receptor colony stimulating factor 1 receptor (CSF1R; CSF-1R; CD115), also known as macrophage colony-stimulating factor receptor (M-CSFR), with potential antineoplastic and immunomodulating activities. Upon administration, emactuzumab binds to CSF1R expressed on macrophages and inhibits the binding of colony-stimulating factor-1 (CSF-1) to CSF1R. This prevents CSF1R activation and CSF1R-mediated signaling in these cells, which blocks the production of inflammatory mediators by macrophages and reduces inflammation. By blocking both the activity of CSF1R-dependent tumor-associated macrophages (TAMs) and the recruitment of TAMs to the tumor microenvironment, emactuzumab enhances T-cell infiltration and antitumor T-cell immune responses, which inhibits the proliferation of tumor cells. TAMs play key roles in immune suppression and promoting inflammation, tumor cell proliferation and survival.

== Clinical efficacy ==
In a Phase Ib clinical study, biopsies were taken from TGCT subjects before and on emactuzumab treatment, and immunohistochemistry was performed with antibodies against CD68/CD163 (biomarkers for TAMs) and CSF-1R. Altogether, 36 patients (57%) had evaluable paired tumour biopsy samples (taken at baseline and on treatment at four weeks, after two cycles of emactuzumab at doses of 900 – 2000 mg). A significant reduction of >50% of CD68/CD163-positive macrophages and CSF1R-positive macrophages was seen in 22 patients (61%), showing that the neutralisation of CSF-1R by emactuzumab resulted in the concomitant depletion of TAMs. In the efficacy cohort, 45 of 63 patients (71%) had a best overall response of complete response or partial response (PR) and the disease control rate was 98% (62 of 63 patients). None of the patients were assessed with progressive disease at the time of treatment discontinuation, although the majority of patients (39 patients [62%]) only received a limited number of four or five treatment cycles. After one- and two-year follow-up MRI, 19/27 patients (70%) and 9/14 patients (64%), respectively, were still in response at these time points.
