= Synovioma =

Synovioma may refer to:

- Benign synovioma, or giant-cell tumor of the tendon sheath
- Malignant synovioma, also known as: synovial sarcoma
