= Sotuletinib =

Experimental drug for ALS

Sotuletinib (BLZ945) is an experimental drug in development for the treatment of amyotrophic lateral sclerosis (ALS). It works as a colony-stimulating factor 1 (CSF1) receptor inhibitor.
