= Vimseltinib =

Chemical compound

Clinical data
- Trade names: Romvimza
- AHFS/Drugs.com: Monograph
- MedlinePlus: a625067
- License data: US DailyMed: Vimseltinib
- Routes of administration: By mouth
- Drug class: Antineoplastic
- ATC code: L01EX29 (WHO)

Legal status
- Legal status: US: ℞-only; EU: Rx-only

Identifiers
- IUPAC name: 3-methyl-5-[6-methyl-5-[2-(1-methylpyrazol-4-yl)pyridin-4-yl]oxypyridin-2-yl]-2-(propan-2-ylamino)pyrimidin-4-one
- CAS Number: 1628606-05-2
- PubChem CID: 86267612
- IUPHAR/BPS: 11190
- DrugBank: DB17520
- ChemSpider: 95499700
- UNII: PX9FTM69BF
- KEGG: D12238
- ChEMBL: ChEMBL5095202

Chemical and physical data
- Formula: C_{23}H_{25}N_{7}O_{2}
- Molar mass: 431.500 g·mol^{−1}
- 3D model (JSmol): Interactive image
- SMILES: CC1=C(C=CC(=N1)C2=CN=C(N(C2=O)C)NC(C)C)OC3=CC(=NC=C3)C4=CN(N=C4)C
- InChI: InChI=1S/C23H25N7O2/c1-14(2)27-23-25-12-18(22(31)30(23)5)19-6-7-21(15(3)28-19)32-17-8-9-24-20(10-17)16-11-26-29(4)13-16/h6-14H,1-5H3,(H,25,27); Key:TVGAHWWPABTBCX-UHFFFAOYSA-N

Vimseltinib, sold under the brand name Romvimza, is an anti-cancer medication used for the treatment of tenosynovial giant cell tumor. Vimseltinib is a kinase inhibitor. Vimseltinib is a macrophage colony-stimulating factor receptor antagonist.

The most common adverse reactions, including laboratory abnormalities, include increased aspartate aminotransferase, periorbital edema, fatigue, rash, increased cholesterol, peripheral edema, face edema, decreased neutrophils, decreased leukocytes, pruritus, and increased alanine aminotransferase.

Vimseltinib was approved for medical use in the United States in February 2025.

== Medical uses ==
Vimseltinib is indicated for the treatment of adults with symptomatic tenosynovial giant cell tumor for which surgical resection will potentially cause worsening functional limitation or severe morbidity.

== History ==
The efficacy of vimseltinib was evaluated in MOTION (NCT05059262), a double-blind, multicenter, randomized (2:1), placebo-controlled trial in participants with tenosynovial giant cell tumor for whom surgical resection may cause worsening functional limitation or severe morbidity. Eligible participants had a confirmed diagnosis of tenosynovial giant cell tumor with measurable disease (RECIST v1.1) with at least one lesion having a minimum size of 2 cm. Participants were randomized to placebo or vimseltinib, 30 mg twice weekly administered for 24 weeks, during the double-blind period (part 1). During the open-label period (part 2), patients could continue vimseltinib and those receiving placebos could crossover to vimseltinib. Randomization was stratified by tumor location (lower limb versus all other) and region (United States versus Non-US). A total of 123 participants were randomized: 83 to the vimseltinib arm and 40 to placebo during part 1.

The US. Food and Drug Administration (FDA) granted the application for vimseltinib priority review designation.

== Society and culture ==
=== Legal status ===
Vimseltinib was approved for medical use in the United States in February 2025.

In July 2025, the Committee for Medicinal Products for Human Use of the European Medicines Agency adopted a positive opinion, recommending the granting of a marketing authorization for the medicinal product Romvimza, intended for the treatment of adults with symptomatic tenosynovial giant cell tumor. The applicant for this medicinal product is Deciphera Pharmaceuticals (Netherlands) B.V. Vimseltinib was authorized for medical use in the European Union in September 2025.

=== Names ===
Vimseltinib is the international nonproprietary name.

Vimseltinib is sold under the brand name Romvimza.
