= Interleukin 34 =

Protein-coding gene in the species Homo sapiens

IL34
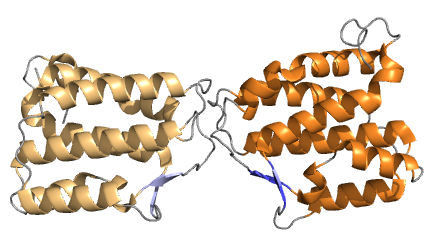

Identifiers
- Aliases: IL34, C16orf77, IL-34, Interleukin 34
- External IDs: OMIM: 612081; MGI: 1923777; GeneCards: IL34
Available structures
PDB	Ortholog search: PDBe RCSB
PDB	List of PDB id codes 4DKC, 4DKD, 4DKE, 4DKF

Gene location (Human)
Chr.	Chromosome 16 (human)
Band	16q22.1	Start	70,579,895 bp
Band	16q22.1	End	70,660,682 bp

Gene location (Mouse)
Chr.	Chromosome 8 (mouse)
Band	8|8 E1	Start	111,468,461 bp
Band	8|8 E1	End	111,532,556 bp
RNA expression pattern
Bgee	Human / Mouse (ortholog); Top expressed in: tibial nerve; skin of arm; spleen; skin of abdomen; skin of leg; sural nerve; parotid gland; vena cava; buccal mucosa cell; Skeletal muscle tissue of rectus abdominis / Top expressed in: superior frontal gyrus; dentate gyrus of hippocampal formation granule cell; zygote; primary visual cortex; right kidney; lip; secondary oocyte; muscle of thigh; proximal tubule; embryo; More reference expression data
BioGPS	n/a
Gene ontology
Molecular function	macrophage colony-stimulating factor receptor binding; cytokine activity; growth factor activity; protein binding; identical protein binding
Cellular component	extracellular region; extracellular space
Biological process	positive regulation of monocyte differentiation; positive regulation of macrophage differentiation; positive regulation of protein phosphorylation; innate immune response; inflammatory response; positive regulation of cell population proliferation; immune system process; regulation of signaling receptor activity; cytokine-mediated signaling pathway; microglial cell proliferation; positive regulation of gene expression; positive regulation of oligodendrocyte differentiation
Sources:Amigo / QuickGO
Orthologs
Databases	NCBI: entry; OMA: entry
Species	Human	Mouse
Entrez	146433	76527
Ensembl	ENSG00000157368	ENSMUSG00000031750
UniProt	Q6ZMJ4	Q8R1R4
RefSeq (mRNA)	NM_001172771; NM_001172772; NM_152456	NM_001135100; NM_029646
RefSeq (protein)	NP_001166242; NP_001166243; NP_689669	NP_001128572; NP_083922
Location (UCSC)	Chr 16: 70.58 – 70.66 Mb	Chr 8: 111.47 – 111.53 Mb
PubMed search
- Wikidata
View/Edit Human	View/Edit Mouse

Interleukin 34 (IL-34) is a protein belonging to a group of cytokines called interleukins. It was originally identified in humans, by large scale screening of secreted proteins; chimpanzee, murine, rat and chicken interleukin 34 orthologs have also been found. The protein is composed of 241 amino acids, 39 kilodaltons in mass, and forms homodimers. IL-34 increases growth or survival of monocytes. In cancer, IL-34 was shown to drive the migration of monocyte-derived tumor-associated macrophages in the tumor microenvironment. IL-34 elicits its activity by binding the Colony stimulating factor 1 receptor.

Messenger RNA (mRNA) expression of human IL-34 is most abundant in spleen but occurs in several other tissues: thymus, liver, small intestine, colon, prostate gland, lung, heart, brain, kidney, testes, and ovary. The discovery of IL-34 protein in the red pulp of the spleen suggests involvement in growth and development of myeloid cells, consistent with its activity on monocytes.
