= PSTPIP2 =

Enzyme found in humans

Identifiers
- Aliases: PSTPIP2, MAYP, proline-serine-threonine phosphatase interacting protein 2
- External IDs: OMIM: 616046; MGI: 1335088; GeneCards: PSTPIP2

Gene location (Human)
Chr.	Chromosome 18 (human)
Band	18q21.1|tdb7990	Start	45,983,536 bp
Band	18q21.1|tdb7990	End	46,072,272 bp
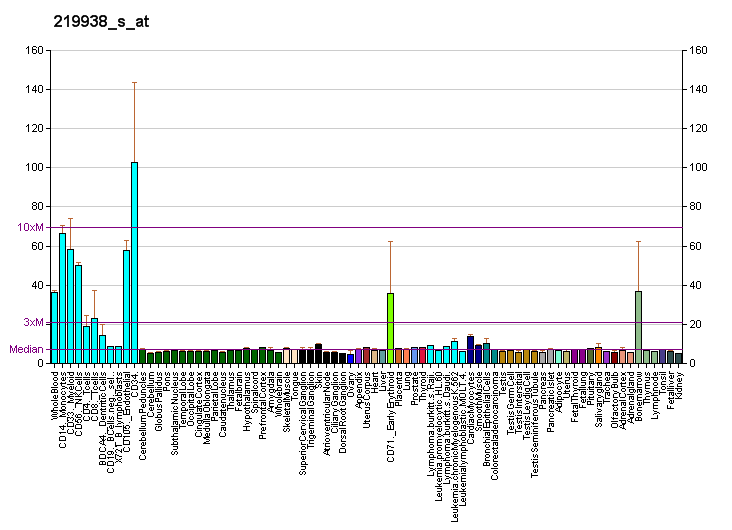
RNA expression pattern
Bgee	Human / Mouse (ortholog); Top expressed in: spleen; monocyte; granulocyte; bone marrow; blood; muscle of thigh; trabecular bone; bone marrow cell; gastrocnemius muscle; biceps brachii / n/a; More reference expression data
BioGPS	More reference expression data
Gene ontology
Molecular function	actin binding; cytoskeletal protein binding; actin filament binding
Cellular component	cytoplasm; cytosol; cytoskeleton; membrane; actin filament; plasma membrane
Biological process	cell migration; cytoskeleton organization; actin filament polymerization
Sources:Amigo / QuickGO
Orthologs
Databases	NCBI: entry; OMA: entry
Species	Human	Mouse
Entrez	9050	19201
Ensembl	ENSG00000152229	ENSMUSG00000025429
UniProt	Q9H939	Q99M15
RefSeq (mRNA)	NM_024430	NM_013831; NM_177831
RefSeq (protein)	NP_077748	NP_038859
Location (UCSC)	Chr 18: 45.98 – 46.07 Mb	n/a
PubMed search
- Wikidata
View/Edit Human	View/Edit Mouse

Proline-serine-threonine phosphatase-interacting protein 2 is an enzyme that in humans is encoded by the PSTPIP2 gene. This protein, also known as macrophage F-actin-associated and tyrosine phosphorylated protein (MAYP) is a member of the Pombe Cdc15 homology (PCH) family of proteins has been shown to coordinate membrane and cytoskeletal dynamics

== Function ==
Pstpip2 is selectively expressed in macrophages and macrophage precursors, and it is an actin bundling protein which regulates filopodia formation and macrophage motility

== Cytokine expression profile ==
PSTPIP2 deficiency leads to elevated levels of circulating inflammatory mediators in vivo. In asymptomatic mice, only MIP-1α and IL-6 are elevated, however symptomatic PSTPIP2-deficient mice have elevated levels of circulating IL-6, MIP-1α, TNF-α, CSF-1 and IP-10 and decreased levels of IL-13

== Disease linkage ==
The missense mutation I282N leads to a macrophage-mediated autoinflammatory disease called Lupo Pstpip2 (Pstpip2^{Lupo/Lupo} ). It is characterized by skin necrosis, inflammation of paws, ears and inflammatory bone resorption. Another mutation in Pstpip2, L98P, was described in chronic multifocal osteomyelitis (cmo) mice. This disease is also autoinflammatory, and causes inflammatory infiltrate of polymorphonuclear leukocytes, macrophages, lymphocytes, plasma cells and osteoclasts. Later the infiltrate is replaced with new bone tissue which lead to tail kinks and hind-foot deformities. The cmo mice also develop ear inflammation in the epidermis, dermis and cartilage.

== Interactions ==
PSTPIP2 interacts with protein tyrosine phosphatases from the proline-, glutamic acid-, serine- and threonine-rich (PEST) family, SHIP1 and Csk
