= Pimicotinib =

Medication

Clinical data
- Trade names: Pimjetmi
- Other names: ABSK021
- Routes of administration: By mouth
- Drug class: Antineoplastic
- ATC code: None

Legal status
- Legal status: CA: ℞-only; US: ℞-only

Identifiers
- IUPAC name: 3,3-Dimethyl-N-[6-methyl-5-[2-(1-methylpyrazol-4-yl)pyridin-4-yl]oxypyridin-2-yl]-2-oxopyrrolidine-1-carboxamide
- CAS Number: 2253123-16-7; 2759304-23-7
- PubChem CID: 139549388; 169490724
- ChemSpider: 128942304
- UNII: HV1XI8HST2; 3JT4QH6TOD
- KEGG: D12938; D12939

Chemical and physical data
- Formula: C_{22}H_{24}N_{6}O_{3}
- Molar mass: 420.473 g·mol^{−1}
- 3D model (JSmol): Interactive image
- SMILES: CC1=C(C=CC(=N1)NC(=O)N2CCC(C2=O)(C)C)OC3=CC(=NC=C3)C4=CN(N=C4)C
- InChI: InChI=1S/C22H24N6O3/c1-14-18(31-16-7-9-23-17(11-16)15-12-24-27(4)13-15)5-6-19(25-14)26-21(30)28-10-8-22(2,3)20(28)29/h5-7,9,11-13H,8,10H2,1-4H3,(H,25,26,30); Key:NXFPMDWYDKHFMM-UHFFFAOYSA-N

Pimicotinib, sold under the brand name Pimjetmi, is an anti-cancer medication used for the treatment of tenosynovial giant cell tumor. It is an oral, highly potent and selective small molecule blocker of the colony-stimulating factor 1 receptor discovered by Abbisko Therapeutics.

== Medical uses ==
Pimicotinib is indicated for the treatment of adults with symptomatic tenosynovial giant cell tumor for which surgical resection will potentially cause worsening functional limitation or severe morbidity.

== History ==
In December 2023, Abbisko Therapeutics entered into a licensing agreement for pimicotinib in all indications for China rights with Merck KGaA.

In April 2023, a global phase III, randomized, double-blind, placebo-controlled, multi-center clinical trial designed to evaluate the safety and efficacy of pimicotinib in people with tenosynovial giant cell tumor was started (NCT05804045).

Following with pimicotinib for tenosynovial giant cell tumor treatment in phase III, pimicotinib has also entered into a phase II trial in June 2023, for Graft-versus-host disease treatment in China.

The US Food and Drug Administration (FDA) and the Center for Drug Evaluation (CDE) of NMPA granted pimicotinib breakthrough therapy designation for the treatment of people with tenosynovial giant cell tumor that are not amenable to surgery in January 2023 and July 2022, respectively.

The US Food and Drug Administration (FDA) approved pimicotinib for medical use in November 2026.
