= Suppressor of cytokine signaling 1 =

Protein-coding gene in the species Homo sapiens

SOCS1

Identifiers
- Aliases: SOCS1, CIS1, CISH1, JAB, SOCS-1, SSI-1, SSI1, TIP3, suppressor of cytokine signaling 1, TIP-3, AISIMD
- External IDs: OMIM: 603597; MGI: 1354910; GeneCards: SOCS1

Gene location (Human)
| Chr. | Chromosome 16 (human) |
| Band | 16p13.13 | Start | 11,254,417 bp |
| Band | 16p13.13 | End | 11,256,204 bp |

Gene location (Mouse)
| Chr. | Chromosome 16 (mouse) |
| Band | 16 A1|16 5.81 cM | Start | 10,600,104 bp |
| Band | 16 A1|16 5.81 cM | End | 10,603,400 bp |
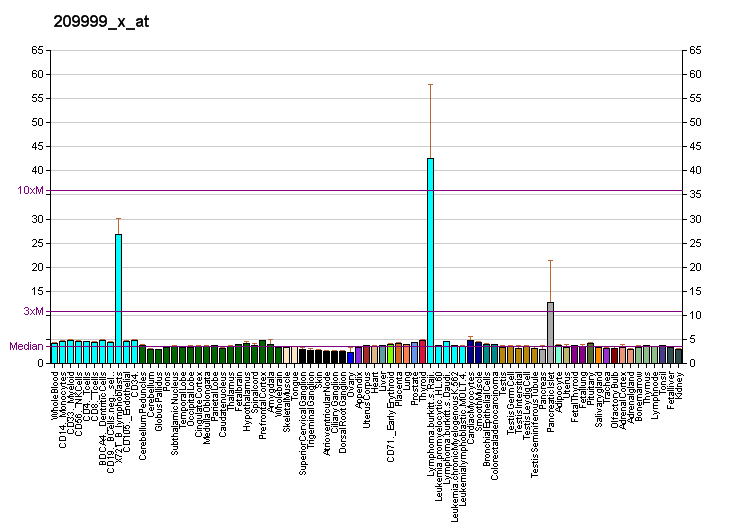

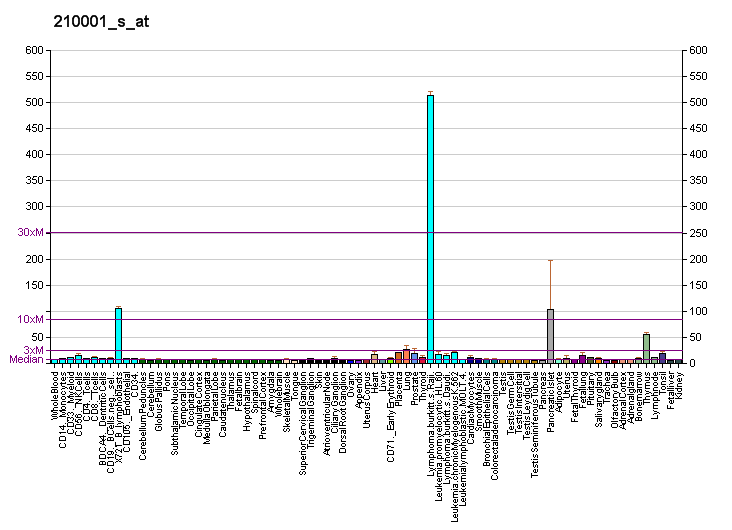
RNA expression pattern
| Bgee | Human / Mouse (ortholog); Top expressed in: beta cell; sperm; canal of the cervix; testicle; spleen; appendix; superficial temporal artery; granulocyte; lymph node; ectocervix / Top expressed in: thymus; granulocyte; submandibular gland; mesenteric lymph nodes; zygote; embryo; morula; secondary oocyte; bone marrow; vastus lateralis muscle; More reference expression data |
| BioGPS | More reference expression data |
Gene ontology
| Molecular function | insulin-like growth factor receptor binding; protein kinase inhibitor activity; protein binding; protein kinase binding; kinase inhibitor activity; 1-phosphatidylinositol-3-kinase regulator activity |
| Cellular component | cytoplasm; cytosol; cytoplasmic vesicle; nucleus; nucleoplasm; cytoplasmic ribonucleoprotein granule; phosphatidylinositol 3-kinase complex |
| Biological process | intracellular signal transduction; regulation of interferon-gamma-mediated signaling pathway; protein ubiquitination; regulation of growth; negative regulation of signal transduction; negative regulation of protein kinase activity; negative regulation of receptor signaling pathway via JAK-STAT; positive regulation of regulatory T cell differentiation; interleukin-7-mediated signaling pathway; regulation of protein phosphorylation; cytokine-mediated signaling pathway; negative regulation of tyrosine phosphorylation of STAT protein; positive regulation of CD4-positive, alpha-beta T cell differentiation; negative regulation of CD8-positive, alpha-beta T cell differentiation; negative regulation of insulin receptor signaling pathway; receptor signaling pathway via JAK-STAT; regulation of activation of Janus kinase activity; negative regulation of kinase activity; regulation of tyrosine phosphorylation of STAT protein; regulation of phosphatidylinositol 3-kinase activity; fat cell differentiation; regulation of receptor signaling pathway via JAK-STAT; phosphatidylinositol phosphate biosynthetic process; cellular response to amino acid stimulus |
Sources:Amigo / QuickGO
Orthologs
| Databases | NCBI: entry; OMA: entry |
| Species | Human | Mouse |
| Entrez | 8651 | 12703 |
| Ensembl | ENSG00000185338 | ENSMUSG00000038037 |
| UniProt | O15524 | O35716 |
| RefSeq (mRNA) | NM_003745 | NM_001271603; NM_009896 |
| RefSeq (protein) | NP_003736 | NP_001258532; NP_034026 |
| Location (UCSC) | Chr 16: 11.25 – 11.26 Mb | Chr 16: 10.6 – 10.6 Mb |
| PubMed search |
- Wikidata
| View/Edit Human | View/Edit Mouse |

Suppressor of cytokine signaling 1 is a protein that in humans is encoded by the SOCS1 gene. SOCS1 orthologs have been identified in several mammals for which complete genome data are available.

== Function ==
This gene encodes a member of the STAT-induced STAT inhibitor (SSI), also known as suppressor of cytokine signalling (SOCS), family. SSI family members are cytokine-inducible negative regulators of cytokine signaling. The expression of this gene can be induced by a subset of cytokines, including IL2, IL3, erythropoietin (EPO), GM-CSF, and interferon-gamma (IFN-γ). The protein encoded by this gene functions downstream of cytokine receptors, and takes part in a negative feedback loop to attenuate cytokine signaling. Knockout studies in mice suggested the role of this gene as a modulator of IFN-γ action, which is required for normal postnatal growth and survival.

Several recent viral studies have shown that viral genes, such as Tax gene product (Tax), encoded by HTLV-1, could hijack SOCS1 to inhibit host antiviral pathways, as a strategy to evade host immunity.

== Interactions ==
The suppressor of cytokine signaling 1 has been shown to interact with:

- Tax,
- CD117,
- Colony stimulating factor 1 receptor
- Growth hormone receptor,
- IRS2,
- Janus kinase 2, and
- TEC.

== See also ==
- SOCS
- JAK-STAT signaling pathway
