= SOCS5 =

Protein-coding gene in the species Homo sapiens

Identifiers
- Aliases: SOCS5, CIS6, CISH6, Cish5, SOCS-5, suppressor of cytokine signaling 5
- External IDs: OMIM: 607094; MGI: 2385459; GeneCards: SOCS5
Available structures
| PDB | Ortholog search: PDBe RCSB |
| PDB | List of PDB id codes 2N34 |

Gene location (Human)
| Chr. | Chromosome 2 (human) |
| Band | 2p21 | Start | 46,698,952 bp |
| Band | 2p21 | End | 46,780,245 bp |

Gene location (Mouse)
| Chr. | Chromosome 17 (mouse) |
| Band | 17|17 E4 | Start | 87,415,107 bp |
| Band | 17|17 E4 | End | 87,445,267 bp |
RNA expression pattern
| Bgee | Human / Mouse (ortholog); Top expressed in: sperm; buccal mucosa cell; endothelial cell; germinal epithelium; lactiferous duct; parietal pleura; saphenous vein; cerebellar vermis; stromal cell of endometrium; Epithelium of choroid plexus / Top expressed in: substantia nigra; ventromedial nucleus; anterior amygdaloid area; nucleus accumbens; lateral septal nucleus; olfactory tubercle; mammillary body; globus pallidus; lateral hypothalamus; subiculum; More reference expression data |
| BioGPS | n/a |
Gene ontology
| Molecular function | epidermal growth factor receptor binding; protein kinase inhibitor activity; receptor tyrosine kinase binding; protein binding; 1-phosphatidylinositol-3-kinase regulator activity |
| Cellular component | cytoplasm; cytosol; phosphatidylinositol 3-kinase complex |
| Biological process | receptor signaling pathway via JAK-STAT; intracellular signal transduction; epidermal growth factor receptor signaling pathway; negative regulation of epidermal growth factor-activated receptor activity; cell growth; protein ubiquitination; regulation of growth; positive regulation of proteasomal ubiquitin-dependent protein catabolic process; negative regulation of receptor signaling pathway via JAK-STAT; negative regulation of T-helper 2 cell differentiation; positive regulation of T-helper 1 cell differentiation; negative regulation of signal transduction; negative regulation of interleukin-6 production; negative regulation of inflammatory response; cellular response to low-density lipoprotein particle stimulus; negative regulation of monocyte chemotactic protein-1 production; vascular endothelial cell response to fluid shear stress; post-translational protein modification; cytokine-mediated signaling pathway; regulation of phosphatidylinositol 3-kinase activity; phosphatidylinositol phosphate biosynthetic process |
Sources:Amigo / QuickGO
Orthologs
| Databases | NCBI: entry; OMA: entry |
| Species | Human | Mouse |
| Entrez | 9655 | 56468 |
| Ensembl | ENSG00000171150 | ENSMUSG00000037104 |
| UniProt | O75159 | O54928 |
| RefSeq (mRNA) | NM_144949; NM_014011 | NM_019654 |
| RefSeq (protein) | NP_054730; NP_659198 | NP_062628 |
| Location (UCSC) | Chr 2: 46.7 – 46.78 Mb | Chr 17: 87.42 – 87.45 Mb |
| PubMed search |
- Wikidata
| View/Edit Human | View/Edit Mouse |

Suppressor of cytokine signaling 5 is a protein that in humans is encoded by the SOCS5 gene.

The protein encoded by this gene contains a SH2 domain and a SOCS BOX domain. The protein thus belongs to the suppressor of cytokine signaling (SOCS) family, also known as STAT-induced STAT inhibitor (SSI) protein family. SOCS family members are known to be cytokine-inducible negative regulators of cytokine signaling. The specific function of this protein has not yet been determined. Two alternatively spliced transcript variants encoding an identical protein have been reported.
