= Villonodular synovitis =

Group of medical conditions

Villonodular synovitis is a type of synovial swelling.

Types include:

- Pigmented villonodular synovitis
- Giant cell tumor of the tendon sheath

Though they have very different names, they have the same histology, and stain positive for CD68, HAM56, and vimentin. They are sometimes discussed together.
