= Insulin receptor substrate 2 =

Protein-coding gene in the species Homo sapiens

IRS2
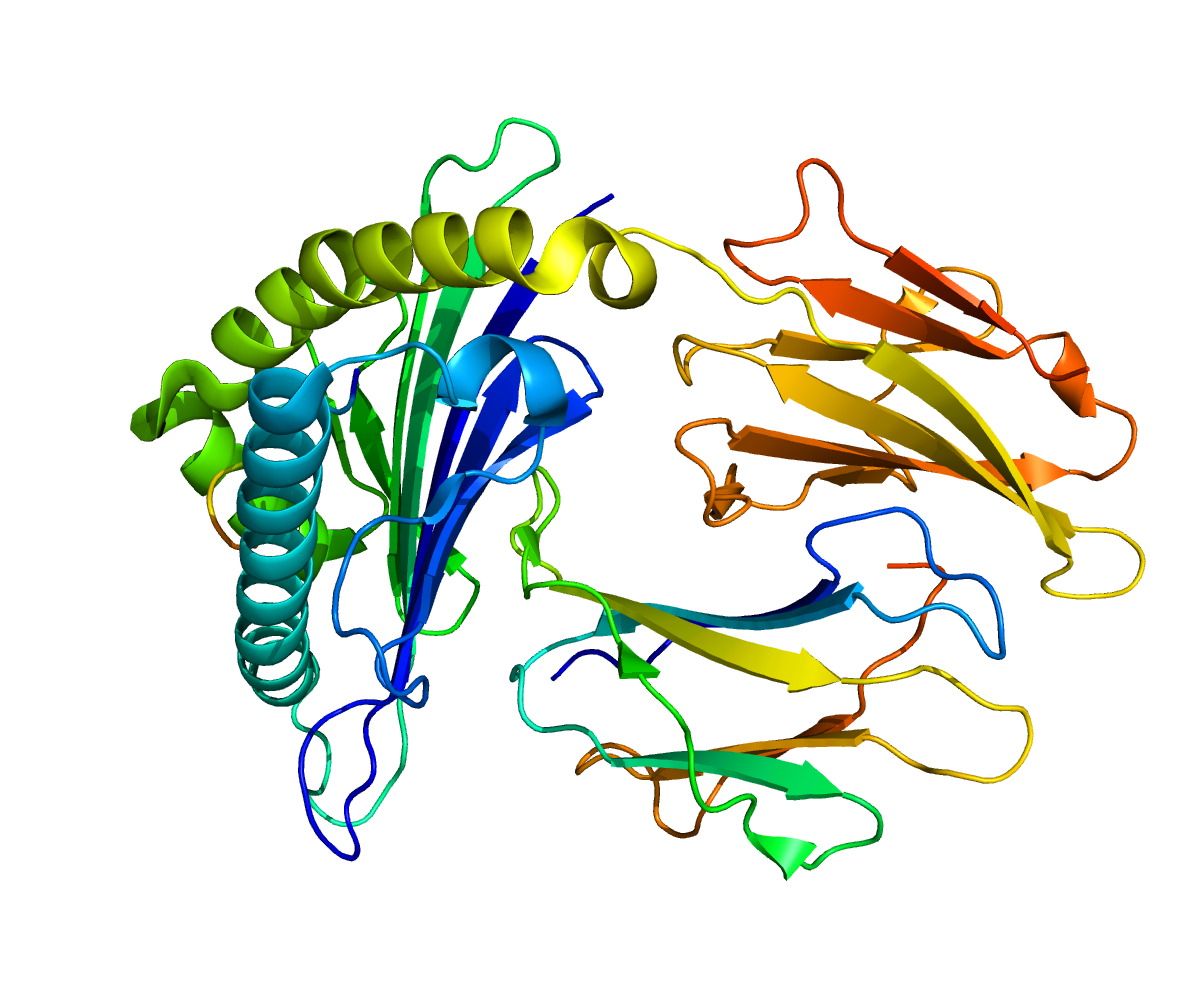

Identifiers
- Aliases: IRS2, IRS-2, insulin receptor substrate 2
- External IDs: OMIM: 600797; MGI: 109334; GeneCards: IRS2
Available structures
PDB	Ortholog search: PDBe RCSB
PDB	List of PDB id codes 3FQW, 3FQX

Gene location (Human)
Chr.	Chromosome 13 (human)
Band	13q34	Start	109,752,695 bp
Band	13q34	End	109,786,583 bp

Gene location (Mouse)
Chr.	Chromosome 8 (mouse)
Band	8 A1.1|8 5.35 cM	Start	11,034,681 bp
Band	8 A1.1|8 5.35 cM	End	11,058,458 bp
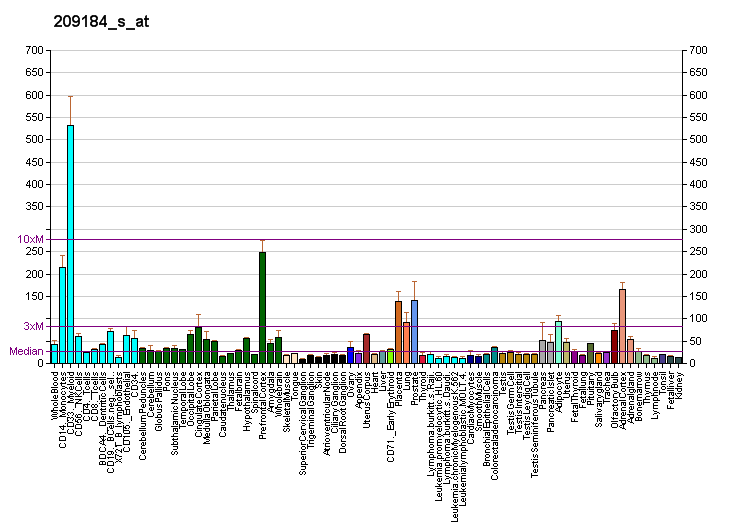

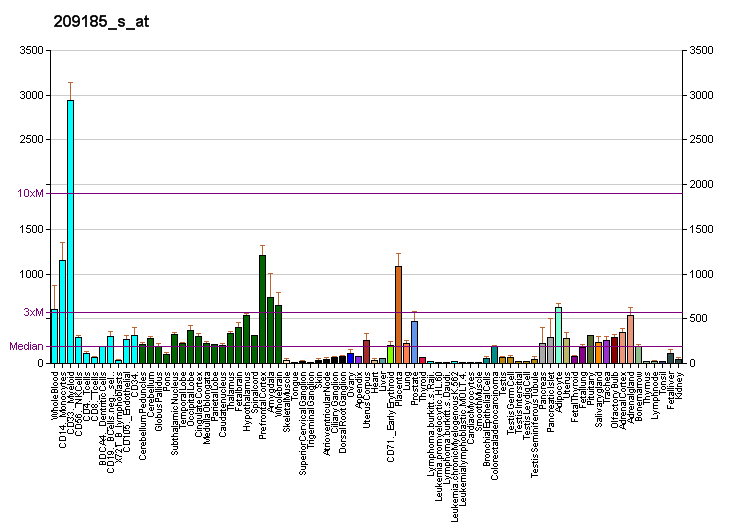
RNA expression pattern
Bgee	Human / Mouse (ortholog); Top expressed in: decidua; Region I of hippocampus proper; postcentral gyrus; dorsal motor nucleus of vagus nerve; mucosa of paranasal sinus; orbitofrontal cortex; Brodmann area 46; lateral nuclear group of thalamus; entorhinal cortex; middle temporal gyrus / Top expressed in: skin of toe; tail of embryo; Rostral migratory stream; molar; muscle of thigh; genital tubercle; primary visual cortex; superior frontal gyrus; entorhinal cortex; cerebellar cortex; More reference expression data
BioGPS	More reference expression data
Gene ontology
Molecular function	insulin receptor binding; 14-3-3 protein binding; phosphatidylinositol 3-kinase binding; protein binding; protein kinase binding; phosphatidylinositol-4,5-bisphosphate 3-kinase activity; 1-phosphatidylinositol-3-kinase activity; signal transducer activity; protein phosphatase binding; protein domain specific binding
Cellular component	cytoplasm; cytosol; plasma membrane; protein-containing complex
Biological process	positive regulation of fatty acid beta-oxidation; positive regulation of glucose import; positive regulation of glycogen biosynthetic process; cellular response to peptide; positive regulation of cell migration; positive regulation of glucose metabolic process; response to glucose; MAPK cascade; mammary gland development; regulation of lipid metabolic process; negative regulation of long-chain fatty acid import across plasma membrane; brain development; positive regulation of mesenchymal cell proliferation; positive regulation of B cell proliferation; positive regulation of cell population proliferation; lipid homeostasis; glucose metabolic process; cellular response to insulin stimulus; negative regulation of B cell apoptotic process; cell population proliferation; phosphatidylinositol-mediated signaling; cellular response to glucose stimulus; signal transduction; positive regulation of insulin secretion; negative regulation of kinase activity; phosphatidylinositol-3-phosphate biosynthetic process; phosphatidylinositol phosphate biosynthetic process; insulin receptor signaling pathway; axon guidance; interleukin-7-mediated signaling pathway; positive regulation of protein kinase B signaling; positive regulation of phosphatidylinositol 3-kinase signaling; positive regulation of Ras protein signal transduction
Sources:Amigo / QuickGO
Orthologs
Databases	NCBI: entry; OMA: entry
Species	Human	Mouse
Entrez	8660	384783
Ensembl	ENSG00000185950	ENSMUSG00000038894
UniProt	Q9Y4H2	P81122
RefSeq (mRNA)	NM_003749	NM_001081212
RefSeq (protein)	NP_003740	NP_001074681
Location (UCSC)	Chr 13: 109.75 – 109.79 Mb	Chr 8: 11.03 – 11.06 Mb
PubMed search
- Wikidata
View/Edit Human	View/Edit Mouse

Insulin receptor substrate 2 is a protein that in humans is encoded by the IRS2 gene.

== Function ==
This gene encodes the insulin receptor substrate 2, a cytoplasmic signaling molecule that mediates effects of insulin, insulin-like growth factor 1, and other cytokines by acting as a molecular adaptor between diverse receptor tyrosine kinases and downstream effectors. The product of this gene is phosphorylated by the insulin receptor tyrosine kinase upon receptor stimulation, as well as by an interleukin 4 receptor-associated kinase in response to IL4 treatment.

Mice lacking IRS2 have a diabetic phenotype as well as a 40% reduction in brain mass.

== Interactions ==
IRS2 has been shown to interact with:

- PLCG1,
- SOCS1, and
- PIK3R1,
