= PRKX =

Protein-coding gene in the species Homo sapiens

Identifiers
- Aliases: PRKX, PKX1, protein kinase, X-linked, protein kinase X-linked
- External IDs: OMIM: 300083; MGI: 1309999; GeneCards: PRKX
Enzyme activity
EC #	BRENDA	ExPASy	KEGG	MetaCyc
2.7.11.1	↗	↗	↗	↗

Gene location (Human)
Chr.	X chromosome (human)
Band	Xp22.33	Start	3,604,340 bp
Band	Xp22.33	End	3,713,649 bp

Gene location (Mouse)
Chr.	X chromosome (mouse)
Band	X|X B	Start	76,805,017 bp
Band	X|X B	End	76,839,884 bp
RNA expression pattern
Bgee	Human / Mouse (ortholog); Top expressed in: ganglionic eminence; monocyte; left lobe of thyroid gland; right lobe of thyroid gland; right uterine tube; granulocyte; skin of abdomen; skin of leg; endometrium; right lung / Top expressed in: lumbar spinal ganglion; olfactory epithelium; ascending aorta; gastrula; aortic valve; trigeminal ganglion; blood; decidua; conjunctival fornix; submandibular gland; More reference expression data
BioGPS	n/a
Gene ontology
Molecular function	transferase activity; nucleotide binding; protein kinase activity; cAMP-dependent protein kinase activity; kinase activity; protein serine/threonine kinase activity; protein binding; ATP binding
Cellular component	cytoplasm; nucleus
Biological process	myeloid cell differentiation; cell differentiation; regulation of cell migration; phosphorylation; epithelial tube morphogenesis; multicellular organism development; protein phosphorylation; cell-substrate adhesion; regulation of cell adhesion; cell adhesion; peptidyl-serine phosphorylation; endothelial cell proliferation; kidney morphogenesis; angiogenesis; protein autophosphorylation; endothelial cell migration; regulation of epithelial cell differentiation involved in kidney development
Sources:Amigo / QuickGO
Orthologs
Databases	NCBI: entry; OMA: entry
Species	Human	Mouse
Entrez	5613	19108
Ensembl	ENSG00000183943	ENSMUSG00000035725
UniProt	P51817	Q922R0
RefSeq (mRNA)	NM_005044	NM_016979
RefSeq (protein)	NP_005035; NP_005035.1	NP_058675
Location (UCSC)	Chr X: 3.6 – 3.71 Mb	Chr X: 76.81 – 76.84 Mb
PubMed search
- Wikidata
View/Edit Human	View/Edit Mouse

Protein kinase, X-linked is a protein that in humans is encoded by the PRKX gene.

== Function ==
This gene encodes a serine threonine protein kinase that has similarity to the catalytic subunit of cyclic AMP dependent protein kinases. The encoded protein is developmentally regulated and may be involved in renal epithelial morphogenesis. This protein may also be involved in macrophage and granulocyte maturation. Abnormal recombination between this gene and a related pseudogene on chromosome Y is a frequent cause of sex reversal disorder in XX males and XY females. Pseudogenes of this gene are found on chromosomes X, 15 and Y.

== Nomenclature ==
Mouse ortholog for this gene, Prkx, is also known as Pkare.
