= GRB2 associated binding protein 3 =

Protein-coding gene in humans

GAB3

Identifiers
- Aliases: GAB3, GRB2 associated binding protein 3
- External IDs: OMIM: 300482; MGI: 2387324; GeneCards: GAB3

Gene location (Human)
Chr.	X chromosome (human)
Band	Xq28	Start	154,675,249 bp
Band	Xq28	End	154,751,583 bp

Gene location (Mouse)
Chr.	X chromosome (mouse)
Band	X|X A7.3	Start	74,010,449 bp
Band	X|X A7.3	End	74,129,064 bp
RNA expression pattern
Bgee	Human / Mouse (ortholog); Top expressed in: myocardium of left ventricle; cardiac muscle tissue of right atrium; granulocyte; apex of heart; blood; spleen; monocyte; gonad; trabecular bone; testicle / Top expressed in: zygote; granulocyte; stroma of bone marrow; blood; embryo; secondary oocyte; embryo; Rostral migratory stream; spleen; thymus; More reference expression data
BioGPS	n/a
Orthologs
Databases	NCBI: entry; OMA: entry
Species	Human	Mouse
Entrez	139716	210710
Ensembl	ENSG00000160219	ENSMUSG00000032750
UniProt	Q8WWW8	Q8BSM5
RefSeq (mRNA)	NM_001081573; NM_001282283; NM_080612	NM_181584
RefSeq (protein)	NP_001075042; NP_001269212; NP_542179	NP_853615
Location (UCSC)	Chr X: 154.68 – 154.75 Mb	Chr X: 74.01 – 74.13 Mb
PubMed search
- Wikidata
View/Edit Human	View/Edit Mouse

GRB2 associated binding protein 3 is a protein that in humans is encoded by the GAB3 gene.

== Function ==
This gene is a member of the GRB2-associated binding protein gene family. These proteins are scaffolding/docking proteins that are involved in several growth factor and cytokine signaling pathways, and they contain a pleckstrin homology domain, and bind SHP2 tyrosine phosphatase and GRB2 adapter protein. The protein encoded by this gene facilitates macrophage differentiation. Alternative splicing results in multiple transcript variants.
