= Tumor-associated macrophage =

Type of macrophage

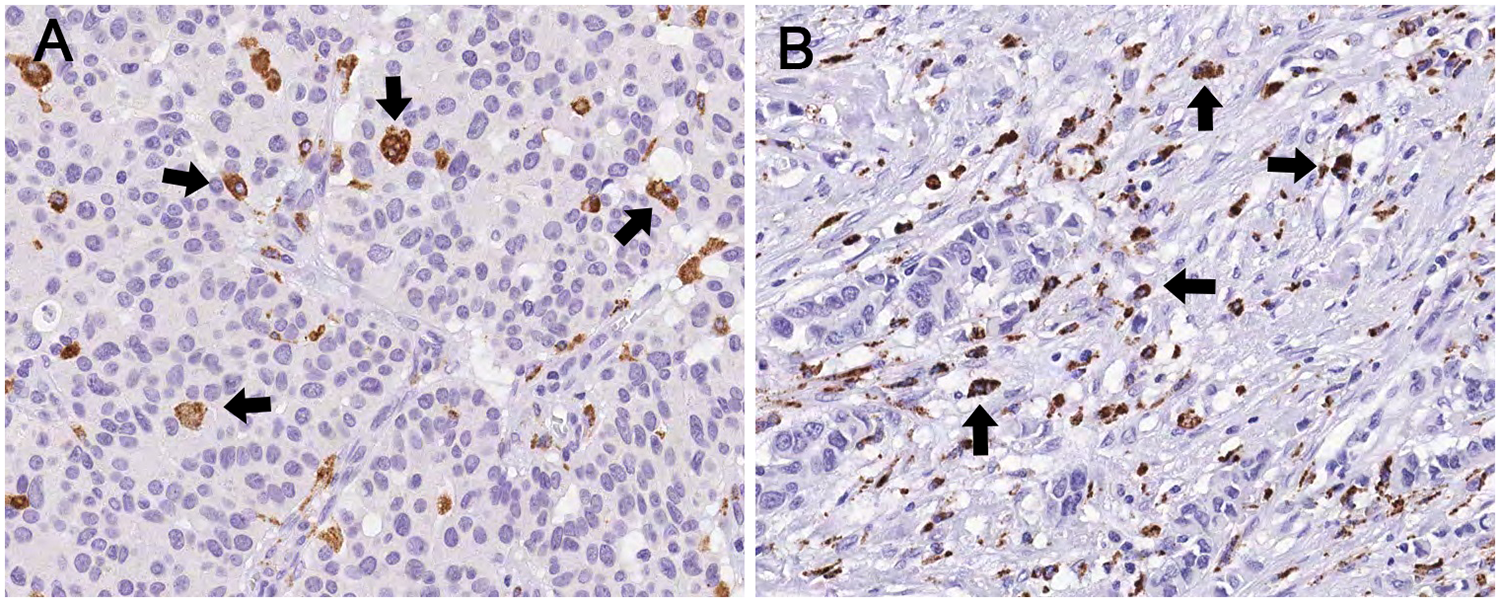
Tumor-associated macrophage (arrows) in breast cancer.

Tumor-associated macrophages (TAMs) are a class of immune cells present in high numbers in the microenvironment of solid tumors. They are heavily involved in cancer-related inflammation. Macrophages are known to originate from bone marrow-derived blood monocytes (monocyte-derived macrophages) or yolk sac progenitors (tissue-resident macrophages), but the exact origin of TAMs in human tumors remains to be elucidated. The composition of monocyte-derived macrophages and tissue-resident macrophages in the tumor microenvironment depends on the tumor type, stage, size, and location, thus it has been proposed that TAM identity and heterogeneity is the outcome of interactions between tumor-derived, tissue-specific, and developmental signals.

== Function ==
Although there is some debate, most evidence suggests that TAMs have a tumor-promoting phenotype. TAMs affect most aspects of tumor cell biology and drive pathological phenomena including tumor cell proliferation, tumor angiogenesis, invasion and metastasis, immunosuppression, and drug resistance.

=== Angiogenesis ===
Tumor angiogenesis is the process by which a tumor forms new blood vessels in order to maintain a supply of nutrients and oxygen and to grow beyond a few millimeters in size. The formation of vasculature also facilitates the escape of malignant cells into blood circulation and the onset of metastasis. One of the primary tumor-promoting mechanisms of TAMs is the secretion of potent pro-angiogenic factors. The most highly expressed and well-characterized angiogenic factor produced by TAMs is vascular endothelial growth factor A (VEGF-A). TAMs accumulate in hypoxic regions of the tumor, which induces the expression of hypoxia-inducible factors (HIF-1) that regulate VEGF expression. In addition to producing VEGF-A, TAMs have been shown to modulate VEGF-A concentration through matrix metalloproteinase (MMP)-9 activity and by producing WNT7B that induces endothelial cells to produce VEGF-A.

In addition to VEGF-A, TAMs secrete the pro-angiogenic factors tumor necrosis factor α (TNF-α), basic fibroblast growth factor, urokinase-type plasminogen activator, adrenomedullin, and semaphorin 4D. Moreover, cytokines produced by TAMs induce tumor cells to produce pro-angiogenic factors, thereby working cooperatively to turn on the angiogenic switch.

A class of TAMs expressing Tie2 have been shown to induce tumor angiogenesis. Tie2^{+} TAMs associate with blood vessels through angiopoietin-2 produced by endothelial cells and activate angiogenesis through paracrine signaling. When angiopoietin-2 is bound, these TAMs upregulate expression of more angiogenic factors, such as thymidine phosphorylase and cathepsin B. Angiopoietin-2 also causes Tie2^{+} TAMs to express T-cell regulating factors interleukin (IL)-10 and chemokine (C-C motif) ligand (CCL) 17; these factors limit T-cell proliferation and upregulate expansion of regulatory T cells, allowing tumor cells to evade immune responses.

Tumor lymphangiogenesis is closely related to tumor angiogenesis, and there is substantial evidence that factors produced by TAMs, especially those of the VEGF family and their receptor tyrosine kinases, are responsible for this link. In low-oxygen regions of a solid tumor, mononuclear myeloid-derived suppressor cells (M-MDSC) quickly turn into tumor-associated macrophages. Additionally, the crosstalk between M-MDSCs and other macrophages enhance the protumor activities of TAMs.

=== Immune suppression ===
One of the major functions of TAMs is suppressing the T-cell mediated anti-tumor immune response. Gene expression analysis of mouse models of breast cancer and fibrosarcoma shows that TAMs have immunosuppressive transcriptional profiles and express factors including IL-10 and transforming growth factor β (TGFβ). In humans, TAMs have been shown to directly suppress T cell function or even cause their direct cell death through surface presentation of programmed death-ligand 1 (PD-L1) in hepatocellular carcinoma or glioblastoma and B7-homologs in ovarian carcinoma, which activate programmed cell death protein 1 (PD-1) and cytotoxic T-lymphocyte antigen 4 (CTLA-4), respectively, on T cells. In both mouse and humans, TAMs co-expressing T-cell immunoglobulin and mucin-domain containing-3 (TIM-3) and V-domain Ig suppressor of T cell activation (VISTA) have been shown to promote immunotherapy-resistance and inhibit immunogenic cell death (ICD). Inhibitory signals to PD-1 and CTLA-4 are immune checkpoints, and binding of these inhibitory receptors by their ligands prevents T cell receptor signaling, inhibits T cells cytotoxic function, and promotes T cell apoptosis. HIF-1α also induces TAMs to suppress T cell function through arginase-1, but the mechanism by which this occurs is not yet fully understood. Recently, Siglec-15 has also been identified as an immune suppressive molecule that is solely expressed on TAMs, and could be a potential therapeutic target for cancer immunotherapy.

== Subtypes ==
TAMs have historically been described as falling into two categories: M1 and M2. M1 refers to macrophages that undergo "classical" activation by interferon-γ (IFNγ) with either lipopolysaccharide (LPS) or TNF, whereas M2 refers to macrophages that undergo "alternative" activation by IL-4. M1 macrophages are seen to have a pro-inflammatory and cytotoxic (anti-tumoral) function; M2 macrophages are anti-inflammatory (pro-tumoral) and promote wound healing. However, use of the M1/M2 polarization paradigm has led to confusing terminology since M1/M2 are used to describe mature macrophages, but the activation process is complex and involves many related cells in the macrophage family. Moreover, with recent evidence that macrophage populations are tissue- and tumor-specific, it has been proposed that classifying macrophages, including TAMs, as being in one of two distinct stable subsets is insufficient. Rather, TAMs should be viewed as existing on a spectrum. More comprehensive classification systems that account for the dynamic nature of macrophages have been proposed, but have not been adopted by the immunological research community.

== Clinical significance ==
In many tumor types TAM infiltration level has been shown to be of significant prognostic value. TAMs have been linked to poor prognosis in breast cancer, ovarian cancer, types of glioma and lymphoma; better prognosis in colon and stomach cancers and both poor and better prognoses in lung and prostate cancers.

Clinically, in 128 patients with breast cancer it was found that patients with more M2 tumor-associated macrophages had higher-grade tumors, greater microvessel density, and worse overall survival. Patients with more M1 tumor-associated macrophages displayed the opposite effect.

== As a drug target ==
CSF1R inhibitors have been developed as a potential route to reduce the presence of TAMs in the tumor microenvironment. As of 2017, CSF1R inhibitors that are currently in early stage clinical trials include Pexidartinib, PLX7486, ARRY-382, JNJ-40346527, BLZ945, Emactuzumab, AMG820, IMC-CS4, MCS110, and Cabiralizumab. CSF1R inhibitors such as PLX3397 have also been shown to alter the distribution of TAMs throughout the tumor and promote enrichment of the classically activated M1-like phenotype.

Other approaches to enhance tumor response to chemotherapies that have been tested in preclinical models include blocking macrophage recruitment to the tumor site, re-polarizing TAMs, and promoting TAM activation. Remaining challenges in targeting TAMs include determining whether to target depletion or repolarization in combination therapies, and for which tumor types and at what tumor stage TAM-targeted therapy is effective. Re-polarization of TAMs from a M2 to M1 phenotype by drug treatments has shown the ability to control tumor growth, including in combination with checkpoint inhibitor therapy.

== See also ==
- Tumor microenvironment
