= Tenosynovial giant cell tumor =

Human joint disease

- Other names: Localized: Localized pigmented villonodular synovitis (L-PVNS), Giant cell tumor of the tendon sheath (GCT-TS), Nodular tenosynovitis, Localized nodular tenosynovitis, and L-TGCT; Diffuse: Pigmented villonodular synovitis (PVNS), Conventional PVNS, and D-TGCT
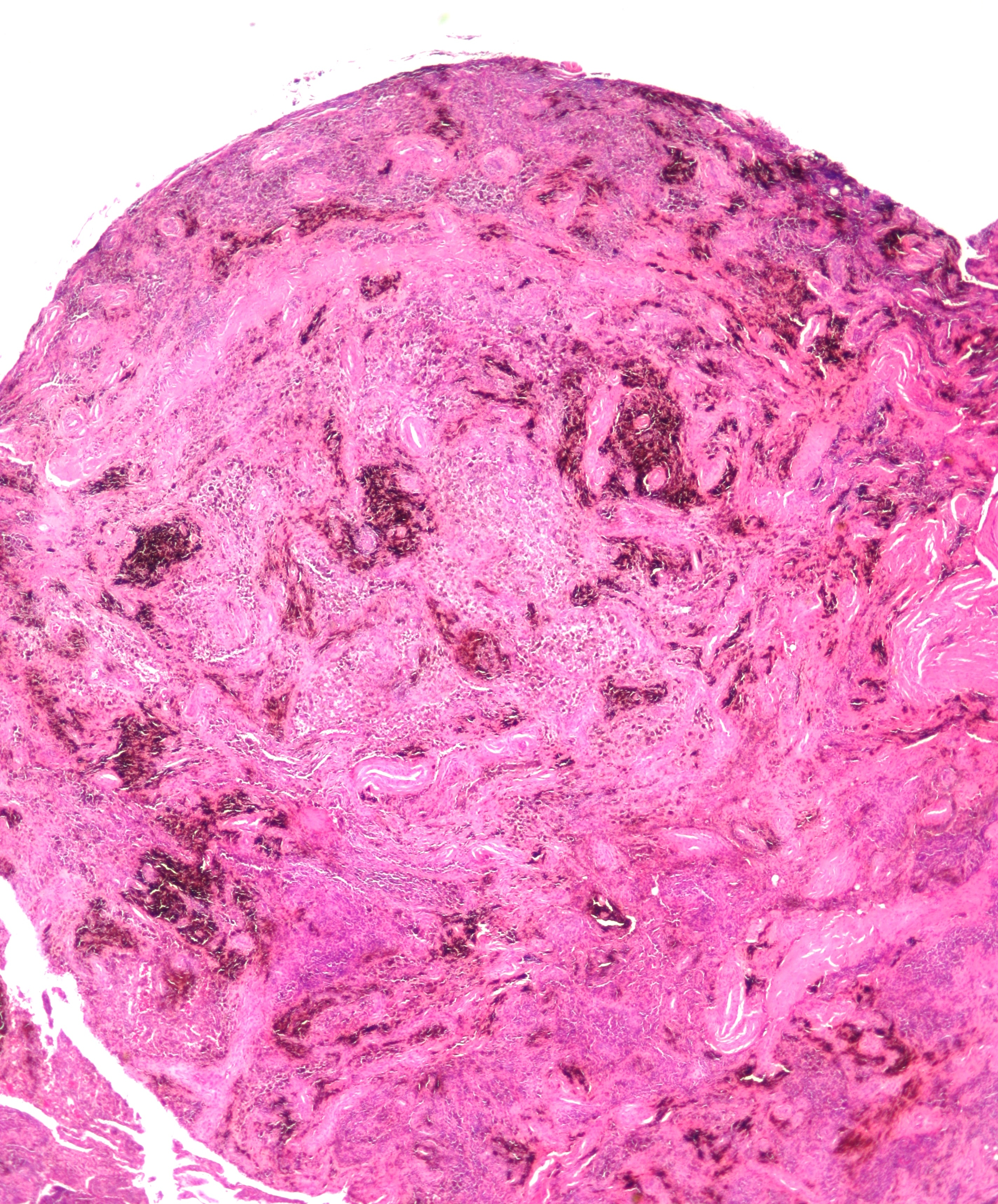
- Micrograph of diffuse TGCT, also known as pigmented villonodular synovitis. H&E stain.
- Specialty: Oncology
- Symptoms: Swelling, pain, stiffness, sensitivity, and/or limited range of motion
- Complications: Osteoarthritis
- Usual onset: Most patients are diagnosed between the age of 30-50.
- Types: Diffuse and localized
- Diagnostic method: MRI, biopsy, surgery
- Differential diagnosis: Fibromas, Baker's cyst, tophaceous gout, synovial sarcoma, hemangioma, synovial chondromatosis, hemorrhagic synovitis
- Treatment: Surgery, CSF1R inhibitors
- Medication: Imatinib, Pexidartinib, Vimseltinib

Tenosynovial giant cell tumor (TGCT) is a non-malignant tumor defined histologically as inclusions of "osteoclast-like" multinucleated giant cells, hemosiderin, and macrophages. This histology can present one of 2 clinically distinct ways. Localized/nodular TGCT (L-TGCT), sometimes referred to as "giant cell tumor of the tendon sheath"; is a common tumor that presents as a slow-growing, encapsulated, localized and limited bump, most frequently in the fingers. Diffuse TGCT (D-TGCT) — also called pigmented villonodular synovitis (PVNS)— is a rare tumor that presents as a proliferative, destructive, intra-articular lesion, most commonly in the knee. D-TGCT tumors often develop from the lining of joints (also known as synovial tissue).. Common symptoms of D-TGCT include swelling, pain, stiffness and reduced mobility in the affected joint or limb.

== Classification ==
Classification for TGCT encompasses two subtypes that can be divided according to site – within a joint (intra-articular) or outside of the joint (extra-articular) – and growth pattern (localized or diffuse) of the tumor(s). Localized and diffuse subsets of TGCT differ in their prognosis, clinical presentation, and biological behavior, but share a similar manner of disease development.

=== Localized TGCT ===
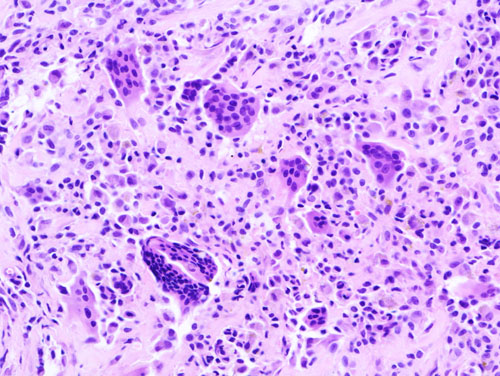
Histopathology of localized TGCT arising in hand finger. H&E stain.

Localized TGCT is sometimes referred to as localized pigmented villonodular synovitis (L-PVNS), giant cell tumor of the tendon sheath (GCT-TS), nodular tenosynovitis, localized nodular tenosynovitis, and L-TGCT.

The localized form of TGCT is more common. Localized TGCT tumors are typically 0.5 cm-4 cm), develop over years, are benign and non-destructive to the surrounding tissue, and may reoccur in the affected area. The most common symptom is painless swelling. Localized TGCT most often occurs in fingers, but can also occur in other joints.

=== Diffuse TGCT ===
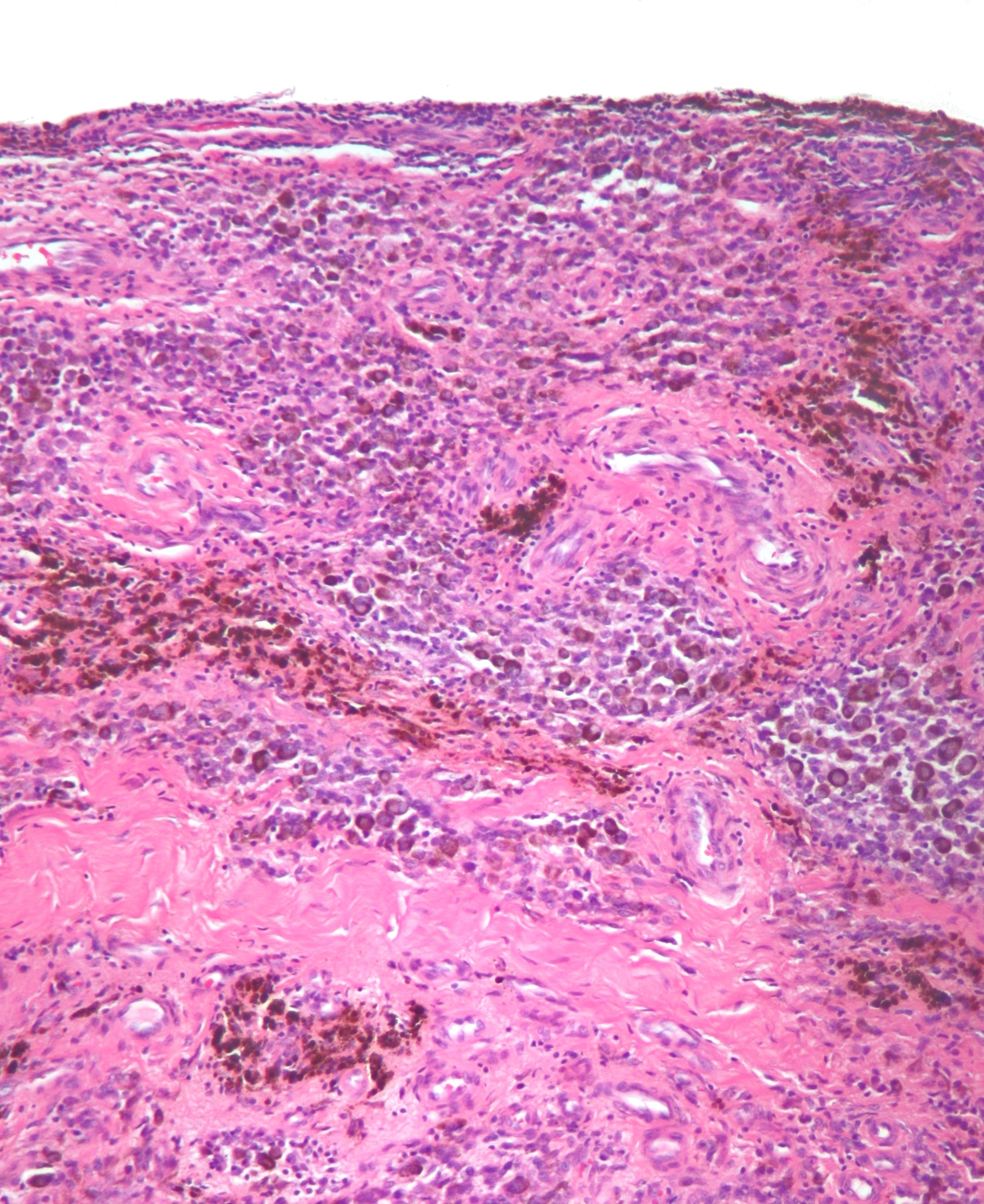
Micrograph of diffuse TGCT showing pigmented hemosiderin-laden macrophages (brown/red). H&E stain.

Diffuse TGCT is sometimes referred to as pigmented villonodular synovitis (PVNS), conventional PVNS, and D-TGCT.

Diffuse TGCT occurs less frequently and is locally aggressive (in some cases, tumors may infiltrate surrounding soft tissue). It most commonly affects people under 40 years old, though the age of occurrence varies. Diffuse TGCT may occur inside a joint (intra-articular) or outside of a joint (extra-articular). Intra-articular tumors typically occur in the knee (approximately 75% of cases) and hip (approximately 15% of cases). Extra-articular tumors are usually found in the knee, thigh, and foot. Symptoms include swelling, pain, sensitivity, and/or limited range of motion. The rate of reoccurrence is estimated to be 18-46% for intra-articular tumors and 33-50% for extra-articular tumors.

==== Complications ====
Diffuse TGCT is locally aggressive and can spread to surrounding tissues, causing bone erosion and tissue damage. If not treated early, it can spread to areas outside the joint, extra-articular, and potentially cause permanent loss of range as well as intense pain.

== Mechanism ==
TGCT tumors grow due to genetic overexpression of colony stimulating factor 1. This causes colony-stimulating factor-1 receptor (CSF1R) cells to accumulate in the joint tissue.

== Diagnosis ==
TGCT can be diagnosed by magnetic resonance imaging (MRI), by biopsy, or during surgery. The disorder is difficult to identify and is often not diagnosed for years due to nonspecific symptoms or a general paucity of symptoms. TGCT cases are often misdiagnosed as osteoarthritis, localized trauma, sports injuries, xanthomas, or other conditions. One study of 122 diffuse TGCT patients found that the average delay in diagnosis was 2.9 years.

To identify or monitor using MRI, the minimum techniques required include T1 weighted images, T2 weighted images, and a fluid sensitive sequence.

== Treatment ==
Patients affected by TGCT should be managed within expert centers or reference networks, by a dedicated, experienced sarcoma multidisciplinary treatment team, including a pathologist, radiologist, orthopaedic surgeon, pain specialist, surgical, radiation and medical oncologists. Patients initially treated at cancer centers have lower recurrence rates than those initially treated by community centers.

Surgery has been the most common form of treatment for both localized and diffuse TGCT. After surgery, patients may receive physical therapy in order to help rehabilitate affected joints. However, recurrence of TGCT after surgery is common, with a higher rate of recurrence for diffuse TGCT than for localized TGCT. In cases of recurrent or resistant disease, multiple surgeries, total joint arthroplasties, or amputation may be required.

A multidisciplinary approach, supplementing surgery or other treatments, can also improve outcomes in cases of recurrent TGCT. In the late 2010s, treatment with CSF1R inhibitors emerged as an option that may help improve functionality for patients with recurrent TGCT or TGCT that is not easily managed by surgery.An oral CSF-1R inhibitor pexidartinib is approved in the US and only available through a Risk Evaluation and Mitigation Strategy (REMS) Program, and two other oral CSF-1R inhibitors, pimicotinib and vimseltinib are being developed in phase 3 trials.

There is insufficient and contradictory evidence on radiation therapy, in the form of radiosynoviorthesis (yttrium injections) or external beam, before or after surgery and thus no recommendation for its use in TGCT can be made.

For asymptomatic patients, active surveillance is the preferred method. Active surveillance includes monitoring with MRI in intervals (e.g., every 6 months) to ensure the delay in treatment does not pose a potential harm. This should be carefully weighed against the potential for over treatment.

Vimseltinib (Romvimza) was approved for medical use in the United States in February 2025.

== Epidemiology ==
A study conducted in the Netherlands estimated that the worldwide incidence of TGCT is 43 cases per million person-years. The majority – 39 cases per million person-years – were estimated to be localized TGCT; the remaining 4 cases per million person-years were estimated to be diffuse TGCT. TGCT can occur in patients of any age, but people with localized TGCT are typically between 30 and 50 years old, while diffuse TGCT tends to affect people under the age of 40.

== See also ==
- Fibroma of tendon sheath
- List of cutaneous conditions
