= Resistant cancer =

Cancer that does not respond to treatment

Resistant cancer or refractory cancer is the cancer that does not respond to medical treatment, especially chemotherapy. It may be resistant at the beginning of treatment, or it may become resistant during treatment. Such cancers are now being targeted with cancer vaccines.

== See also ==
- Antineoplastic resistance
- Drug resistance
