= DOK3 =

Protein-coding gene in the species Homo sapiens

Identifiers
- Aliases: DOK3, DOKL, docking protein 3
- External IDs: OMIM: 611435; MGI: 1351490; GeneCards: DOK3

Gene location (Human)
Chr.	Chromosome 5 (human)
Band	5q35.3	Start	177,501,904 bp
Band	5q35.3	End	177,511,274 bp

Gene location (Mouse)
Chr.	Chromosome 13 (mouse)
Band	13|13 B1	Start	55,671,044 bp
Band	13|13 B1	End	55,677,109 bp
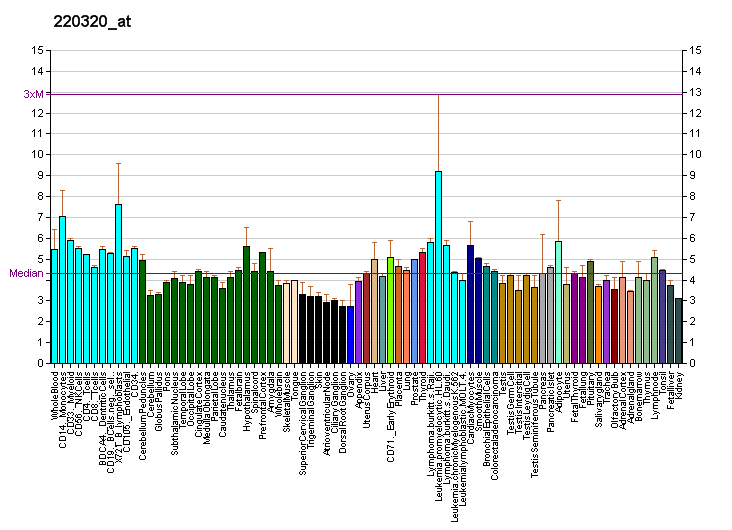
RNA expression pattern
Bgee	Human / Mouse (ortholog); Top expressed in: monocyte; blood; granulocyte; spleen; right lung; lymph node; bone marrow; upper lobe of left lung; trabecular bone; appendix / Top expressed in: granulocyte; blood; spleen; tibiofemoral joint; bone marrow; lymph node; mesenteric lymph nodes; fetal liver hematopoietic progenitor cell; stroma of bone marrow; subcutaneous adipose tissue; More reference expression data
BioGPS	More reference expression data
Gene ontology
Molecular function	protein binding
Cellular component	membrane; cytoplasm; plasma membrane; secretory granule membrane; ficolin-1-rich granule membrane
Biological process	neutrophil degranulation; Ras protein signal transduction
Sources:Amigo / QuickGO
Orthologs
Databases	NCBI: entry; OMA: entry
Species	Human	Mouse
Entrez	79930	27261
Ensembl	ENSG00000146094	ENSMUSG00000035711
UniProt	Q7L591	Q9QZK7
RefSeq (mRNA)	NM_001144875; NM_001144876; NM_001308235; NM_001308236; NM_024872 NM_001375794; NM_001375795; NM_001375796; NM_001375797; NM_001375798; NM_001375799; NM_001384137; NM_001384138; NM_001384139	NM_013739
RefSeq (protein)	NP_001138347; NP_001138348; NP_001295164; NP_001295165; NP_079148 NP_001362723; NP_001362724; NP_001362725; NP_001362726; NP_001362727; NP_001362728; NP_001371066; NP_001371067; NP_001371068	NP_038767
Location (UCSC)	Chr 5: 177.5 – 177.51 Mb	Chr 13: 55.67 – 55.68 Mb
PubMed search
- Wikidata
View/Edit Human	View/Edit Mouse

Docking protein 3 is a protein that in humans is encoded by the DOK3 gene.
