= Macrophage colony-stimulating factor =

Mammalian protein found in humans

CSF1

Identifiers
- Aliases: CSF1, CSF-1, MCSF, colony stimulating factor 1
- External IDs: OMIM: 120420; MGI: 1339753; GeneCards: CSF1
Available structures
PDB	Ortholog search: PDBe RCSB
PDB	List of PDB id codes 1HMC, 3UEZ, 3UF2, 4ADF, 4FA8, 4WRL, 4WRM

Gene location (Human)
Chr.	Chromosome 1 (human)
Band	1p13.3	Start	109,910,242 bp
Band	1p13.3	End	109,930,992 bp

Gene location (Mouse)
Chr.	Chromosome 3 (mouse)
Band	3 F2.3|3 46.83 cM	Start	107,648,364 bp
Band	3 F2.3|3 46.83 cM	End	107,667,785 bp
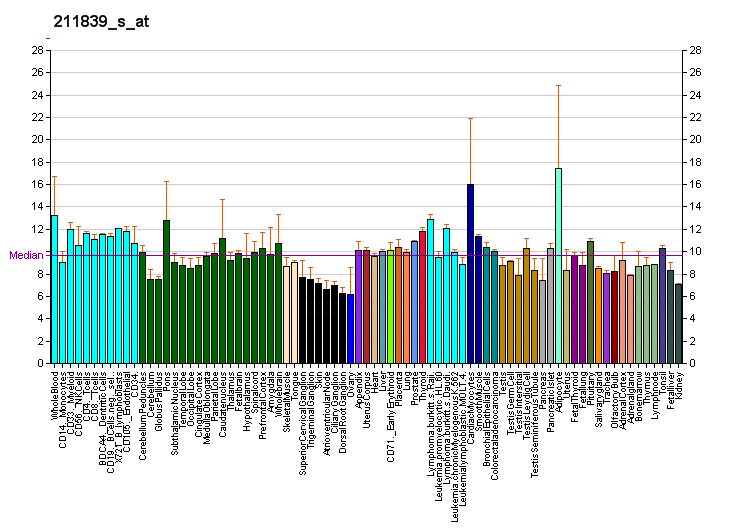

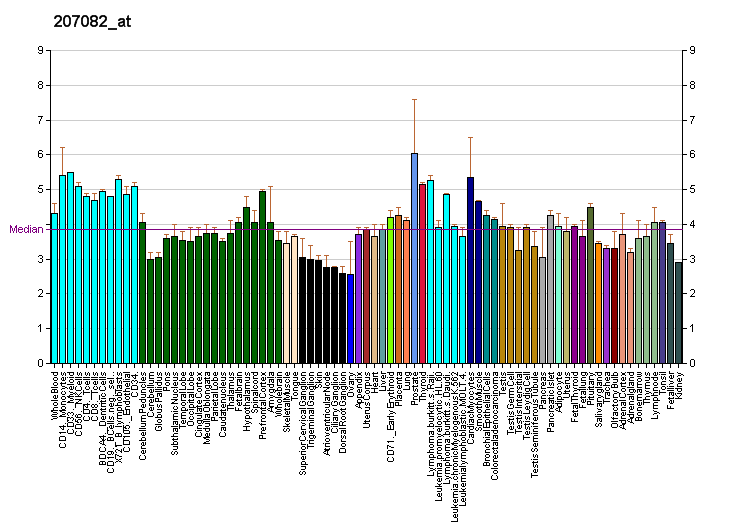
RNA expression pattern
Bgee	Human / Mouse (ortholog); Top expressed in: gallbladder; subcutaneous adipose tissue; right coronary artery; apex of heart; left adrenal gland; left coronary artery; cartilage tissue; right adrenal gland; right adrenal cortex; left adrenal cortex / Top expressed in: stroma of bone marrow; aortic valve; ascending aorta; mesenteric lymph nodes; calvaria; endothelial cell of lymphatic vessel; ankle joint; zygote; secondary oocyte; supraoptic nucleus; More reference expression data
BioGPS	More reference expression data
Gene ontology
Molecular function	protein binding; macrophage colony-stimulating factor receptor binding; protein homodimerization activity; growth factor activity; cytokine activity; identical protein binding
Cellular component	integral component of membrane; perinuclear region of cytoplasm; CSF1-CSF1R complex; membrane; extracellular space; endoplasmic reticulum lumen; extracellular region; plasma membrane
Biological process	positive regulation of microglial cell migration; cell differentiation; positive regulation of protein metabolic process; mammary gland fat development; branching involved in mammary gland duct morphogenesis; transmembrane receptor protein tyrosine kinase signaling pathway; immune system process; positive regulation of Ras protein signal transduction; positive regulation of macrophage colony-stimulating factor signaling pathway; mammary duct terminal end bud growth; monocyte activation; positive regulation of macrophage derived foam cell differentiation; positive regulation of gene expression; macrophage colony-stimulating factor signaling pathway; positive regulation of odontogenesis of dentin-containing tooth; positive regulation of cell population proliferation; regulation of macrophage derived foam cell differentiation; positive regulation of multicellular organism growth; homeostasis of number of cells within a tissue; regulation of ossification; inflammatory response; positive regulation of macrophage chemotaxis; innate immune response; positive regulation of mononuclear cell proliferation; osteoclast proliferation; positive regulation of osteoclast differentiation; positive regulation of cell migration; positive regulation of monocyte differentiation; positive regulation of protein kinase activity; developmental process involved in reproduction; positive regulation of cell-matrix adhesion; positive regulation of macrophage differentiation; cell population proliferation; macrophage differentiation; post-translational protein modification; regulation of signaling receptor activity; cytokine-mediated signaling pathway; hemopoiesis; osteoclast differentiation; response to ischemia; microglial cell proliferation; negative regulation of neuron death
Sources:Amigo / QuickGO
Orthologs
Databases	NCBI: entry; OMA: entry
Species	Human	Mouse
Entrez	1435	12977
Ensembl	ENSG00000184371	ENSMUSG00000014599
UniProt	P09603	P07141
RefSeq (mRNA)	NM_172212; NM_000757; NM_172210; NM_172211	NM_001113529; NM_001113530; NM_007778
RefSeq (protein)	NP_000748; NP_757349; NP_757350; NP_757351	NP_001107001; NP_001107002; NP_031804
Location (UCSC)	Chr 1: 109.91 – 109.93 Mb	Chr 3: 107.65 – 107.67 Mb
PubMed search
- Wikidata
View/Edit Human	View/Edit Mouse

The colony stimulating factor 1 (CSF1), also known as macrophage colony-stimulating factor (M-CSF), is a secreted cytokine which causes hematopoietic stem cells to differentiate into macrophages or other related cell types. Eukaryotic cells also produce M-CSF in order to combat intercellular viral infection. It is one of the three experimentally described colony-stimulating factors. M-CSF binds to the colony stimulating factor 1 receptor. It may also be involved in development of the placenta.

== Structure ==
M-CSF is a cytokine, being a smaller protein involved in cell signaling. The active form of the protein is found extracellularly as a disulfide-linked homodimer, and is thought to be produced by proteolytic cleavage of membrane-bound precursors.

Four transcript variants encoding three different isoforms (a proteoglycan, glycoprotein and cell surface protein) have been found for this gene.

== Function ==
M-CSF (or CSF-1) is a hematopoietic growth factor that is involved in the proliferation, differentiation, and survival of monocytes, macrophages, and bone marrow progenitor cells. M-CSF affects macrophages and monocytes in several ways, including stimulating increased phagocytic and chemotactic activity, and increased tumour cell cytotoxicity. The role of M-CSF is not only restricted to the monocyte/macrophage cell lineage. By interacting with its membrane receptor (CSF1R or M-CSF-R encoded by the c-fms proto-oncogene), M-CSF also modulates the proliferation of earlier hematopoietic progenitors and influence numerous physiological processes involved in immunology, metabolism, fertility and pregnancy.

M-CSF released by osteoblasts (as a result of endocrine stimulation by parathyroid hormone) exerts paracrine effects on osteoclasts. M-CSF binds to receptors on osteoclasts inducing differentiation, and ultimately leading to increased plasma calcium levels—through the resorption (breakdown) of bone. Additionally, high levels of CSF-1 expression are observed in the endometrial epithelium of the pregnant uterus as well as high levels of its receptor CSF1R in the placental trophoblast. Studies have shown that activation of trophoblastic CSF1R by local high levels of CSF-1 is essential for normal embryonic implantation and placental development. More recently, it was discovered that CSF-1 and its receptor CSF1R are implicated in the mammary gland during normal development and neoplastic growth.

== Clinical significance ==
Locally produced M-CSF in the vessel wall contributes to the development and progression of atherosclerosis.

M-CSF has been described to play a role in renal pathology including acute kidney injury and chronic kidney failure. The chronic activation of monocytes can lead to multiple metabolic, hematologic and immunologic abnormalities in patients with chronic kidney failure. In the context of acute kidney injury, M-CSF has been implicated in promoting repair following injury, but also been described in an opposing role, driving proliferation of a pro-inflammatory macrophage phenotype.

== As a drug target ==
PD-0360324 and MCS110 are CSF1 inhibitors in clinical trials for some cancers. See also CSF1R inhibitors.

== Interactions ==
Macrophage colony-stimulating factor has been shown to interact with PIK3R2.
