= CC chemokine receptors =

Protein family

CCR1

Identifiers
- Symbol: CCR1
- NCBI gene: 1230
- HGNC: 1602
- OMIM: 601159
- RefSeq: NM_001295
- UniProt: P32246

Other data
- Locus: Chr. 3 p21
Search for
- Structures: Swiss-model
- Domains: InterPro

CCR2

Identifiers
- Symbol: CCR2
- NCBI gene: 1231
- HGNC: 1603
- OMIM: 601268
- PDB: 1KAD
- RefSeq: NM_000647
- UniProt: P41597

Other data
- Locus: Chr. 3 p21
Search for
- Structures: Swiss-model
- Domains: InterPro

CCR3

Identifiers
- Symbol: CCR3
- NCBI gene: 1232
- HGNC: 1604
- OMIM: 601268
- RefSeq: NM_001837
- UniProt: P51677

Other data
- Locus: Chr. 3 p21
Search for
- Structures: Swiss-model
- Domains: InterPro

CCR4

Identifiers
- Symbol: CCR4
- NCBI gene: 1233
- HGNC: 1605
- OMIM: 604836
- RefSeq: NM_005508
- UniProt: P51679

Other data
- Locus: Chr. 3 p24
Search for
- Structures: Swiss-model
- Domains: InterPro

CCR5

Identifiers
- Symbol: CCR5
- NCBI gene: 1234
- HGNC: 1606
- OMIM: 601373
- PDB: 1ND8
- RefSeq: NM_000579
- UniProt: P51681

Other data
- Locus: Chr. 3 p21
Search for
- Structures: Swiss-model
- Domains: InterPro

CCR6

Identifiers
- Symbol: CCR6
- NCBI gene: 1235
- HGNC: 1607
- OMIM: 601835
- RefSeq: NM_004367
- UniProt: P51684

Other data
- Locus: Chr. 6 q27
Search for
- Structures: Swiss-model
- Domains: InterPro

CCR7

Identifiers
- Symbol: CCR7
- NCBI gene: 1236
- HGNC: 1608
- OMIM: 600242
- RefSeq: NM_001838
- UniProt: P32248

Other data
- Locus: Chr. 17 q12-q21.2
Search for
- Structures: Swiss-model
- Domains: InterPro

CCR8

Identifiers
- Symbol: CCR8
- NCBI gene: 1237
- HGNC: 1609
- OMIM: 601834
- RefSeq: NM_005201
- UniProt: P51685

Other data
- Locus: Chr. 3 p22
Search for
- Structures: Swiss-model
- Domains: InterPro

CCR9

Identifiers
- Symbol: CCR9
- NCBI gene: 10803
- HGNC: 1610
- OMIM: 604738
- RefSeq: NM_031200
- UniProt: P51686

Other data
- Locus: Chr. 3 p21
Search for
- Structures: Swiss-model
- Domains: InterPro

CCR10

Identifiers
- Symbol: CCR10
- NCBI gene: 2826
- HGNC: 4474
- OMIM: 600240
- RefSeq: NM_016602
- UniProt: P46092

Other data
- Locus: Chr. 17 17q21.1-q21
Search for
- Structures: Swiss-model
- Domains: InterPro

CC chemokine receptors (or beta chemokine receptors) are integral membrane proteins that specifically bind and respond to cytokines of the CC chemokine family. They represent one subfamily of chemokine receptors, a large family of G protein-linked receptors that are known as seven transmembrane (7-TM) proteins since they span the cell membrane seven times. To date, ten true members of the CC chemokine receptor subfamily have been described. These are named CCR1 to CCR10 according to the IUIS/WHO Subcommittee on Chemokine Nomenclature.

== Mechanism ==
The CC chemokine receptors all work by activating the G protein G_{i}.

== Types ==
=== Overview table ===
Receptor	Ligands
CCR1	CCL4, CCL5, CCL6, CCL14, CCL15, CCL16, CCL23
CCR2	CCL2, CCL8, CCL16
CCR3	CCL11, CCL26, CCL7, CCL13, CCL15, CCL24, CCL5, CCL28, CCL18
CCR4	CCL3, CCL5, CCL17, CCL22
CCR5	CCL3, CCL4, CCL5, CCL8, CCL11, CCL13, CCL14, CCL16
CCR6	CCL20
CCR7	CCL19, CCL21
CCR8	CCL1, CCL16
CCR9	CCL25
CCR10	CCL27, CCL28
CCR11	CCL19, CCL21, CCL25

=== CCR1 ===
CCR1 was the first CC chemokine receptor identified and binds multiple inflammatory/inducible (see inducible gene) CC chemokines (including CCL4, CCL5, CCL6, CCL14, CCL15, CCL16 and CCL23). In humans, this receptor can be found on peripheral blood lymphocytes and monocytes. There is some suggestion that this chemokine receptor is restricted to memory T-cells within the lymphocyte pool. This receptor is also designated cluster of differentiation marker CD191.

=== CCR2 ===
CCR2 can interact with CCL2, CCL8 and CCL16 and has been identified on the surface of monocytes, activated memory T cells, B cells, and basophils in humans, and also in peritoneal macrophages in mice. CCR2 is also designated CD192.

=== CCR3 ===
CCR3 is a receptor for multiple inflammatory/inducible CC chemokines, including CCL11, CCL26, CCL7, CCL13, CCL15, CCL24 and CCL5 that attract eosinophils, and CCL28 that attracts B and T lymphocytes to mucosal tissues. It is most highly expressed in both eosinophils and basophils, but can also be found in Th1 and Th2 cells and airway epithelial cells. Thus CCR3 plays a role in allergic reactions. CCR3 is also known as CD193.

=== CCR4 ===
CCR4 is expressed on Th2 T lymphocytes and is up-regulated by T cell receptor activation. However, some reports suggest a role for this receptor also in trafficking of dendritic cells. The CC chemokines CCL3, CCL5, CCL17 and CCL22 signal through this receptor.

=== CCR5 ===
CCR5 is expressed on several cell types including peripheral blood-derived dendritic cells, CD34+ hematopoietic progenitor cells and certain activated/memory Th1 lymphocytes. This receptor is well defined as a major coreceptor implicated in susceptibility to HIV-1 infection and disease. This receptor has several CC chemokine ligands including CCL2, CCL3, CCL4, CCL5, CCL11, CCL13, CCL14 and CCL16.

=== CCR6 ===
CCR6, a receptor for CCL20, is expressed on unactivated memory T-cells and some dendritic cells. CCR6 is also expressed on Th17 cells. CCR6 is down-regulated in activated T-cells.

=== CCR7 ===
CCR7 is a highly important receptor with a role in trafficking of B and T lymphocytes and dendritic cells to and across high endothelial venules and positioning those cells correctly in T cell zones of secondary lymphoid organs. Its ligands include the related chemokines CCL19 and CCL21, (previously called ELC and SLC).

=== CCR8 ===
CCR8 is associated with Th2 lymphocytes and is therefore found predominantly in the thymus (in humans) although some expression can be found in the brain, spleen, lymph node, and monocytes at the nucleotide level. The ligands for this receptor are CCL1 and CCL16

=== CCR9 ===
CCR9 was previously called orphan receptor GPR 9-6 and is very highly expressed in thymus (on both immature and mature T-cells) while low in lymph nodes and spleen. CCR9 is also abundant in the gut, with its expression associated with T cells of the intestine. The specific ligand of this receptor is CCL25 To note, the chemokine binding protein D6 had previously been named CCR9, but this molecule is a scavenger receptor not a true (signaling) chemokine receptor.

=== CCR10 ===
CCR10 is receptor for CCL27 and CCL28 that was originally called orphan receptor GPR2. CCR10 has been implicated in inflammation of the skin, and has been shown to recruit regulatory T cells (Tregs) to mucosal layers.

=== CCR11 ===
This molecule was originally designated CCR11 due to its ability to bind several CC chemokines (including CCL19, CCL21 and CCL25) and its structural similarity to chemokine receptors. However, due to the inability of this molecule (also known as CCRL1 and CCX CKR) to generate a signal following ligand interaction, it has been suggested that it is a scavenger receptor for chemokines and not a bona fide chemokine receptor. Thus CCRL1 should not be called CCR11 under the guidelines of the IUIS/WHO Subcommittee on Chemokine Nomenclature.
