= Eotaxin =

Subfamily of eosinophil chemotactic proteins

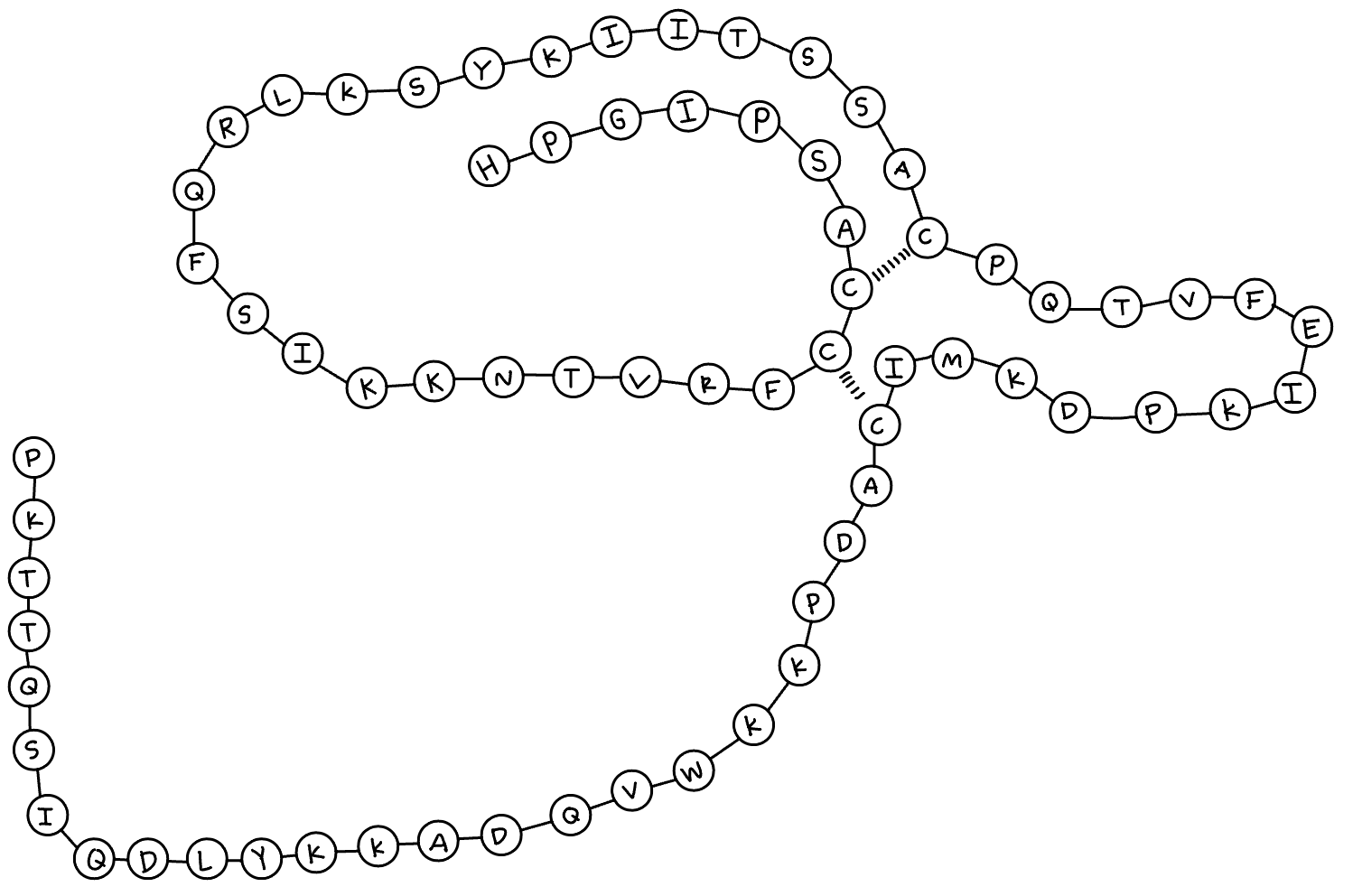
This is an image of the amino acid sequence of eotaxin.

The eotaxins are a CC chemokine subfamily of eosinophil chemotactic proteins. Eotaxin is a special CC chemokine because it primarily attracts eosinophils. By being a chemoattractant for eosinophils, eotaxin has a direct relationship with inflammation. This is because eosinophils are known to promote inflammation. In order to induce stimulation, eotaxin binds with the CCR-3 receptor. The binding of eotaxin with the CCR-3 Receptor recruits eosinophils, which ultimately induces inflammation. According to early studies, the production of eotaxin can be linked to Th2 lymphocytes. Eotaxin appears to be T-cell dependent because of evidence that suggests that eosinophil recruitment is regulated by Th2 lymphocytes. The regulation occurs because of the presence of the CCR-3 Receptor on the Th2 lymphocyte. Some examples of the types of cells that have the ability of synthesizing eotaxin are lung cells, vascular endothelial cells, and macrophages.

In humans, there are three family members:

- CCL11 (eotaxin-1)
- CCL24 (eotaxin-2)
- CCL26 (eotaxin-3)

== Structure and Role ==
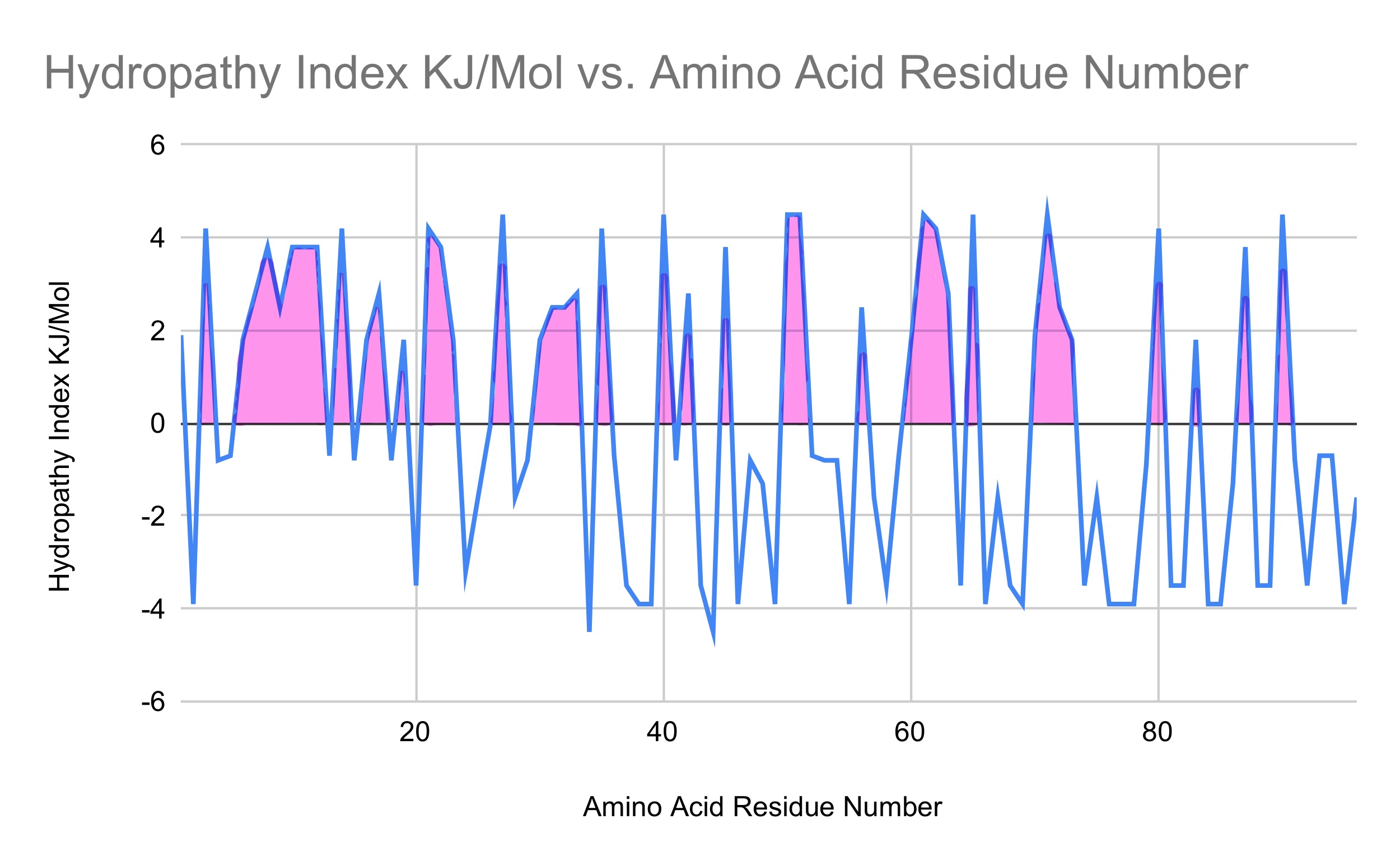
This is a hydropathy plot of the eotaxin protein.

After analyzing the cDNA from guinea pig cDNA, it is determined that eotaxin is a 96 amino acid sequence. The beginning 23 amino acids are hydrophobic, while the remaining 73 are what make up the active eotaxin protein. Within the 73 amino acids present in the active eotaxin protein, there is similarity with other C-C chemokines that are categorized as “eosinophil- activating.” Some of these are human MPC-3 with a 51% similarity, human MPC-1 with 53% similarity and MPC-2 with a 54% similarity. According to another source, Human MPC- 3 shares 57% of the same amino acid sequence and has 65% of the same amino acids. As for the nucleotide base pairs, eotaxin shares 71% of its nucleotide sequence with MPC-3. Both Human MPC-3 and eotaxin are active on eosinophils, which means that they both will bind to the receptors found on eosinophils. In humans, the gene that encodes for the eotaxin protein is found on chromosome 17. The gene is made up of three exons and two introns. The leader sequence of eotaxin is homologous to the leader sequence of the other members of the C-C chemokine family, such as the MPC family.

One of eotaxin's roles is eosinophil recruitment, but eotaxin shares this role with other chemoattractants. In early studies, it is revealed that eotaxin mRNA and proteins are likely involved in maintaining basal eosinophil levels. The evidence of this was found in the guinea pig lung. A more unique role of eotaxin is its regulation of the baseline tissue level of mature leukocytes. This is specific to those found in a non-hematopoietic tissues. The homologous relationship of the leader sequences eotaxin and the MPC family provide evidence that there might be an additional role that these leader sequences may have. The leader sequences could all share the role cell targeting, but more research will need to be completed regarding that.

== Eotaxin and the CCR-3 Receptor ==
The CCR 3 receptor is a CC chemokine receptor that is a 7-transmembrane, G-linked protein receptor. This receptor is primarily found on eosinophils and basophils. The CCR 3 receptor is what regulates the eotaxin's activity. It does this through selective expression. When eotaxin binds with the CCR 3 Receptor, it induces biological changes. Some examples of these biological changes are the activation of both Gi Proteins as well as the activation of the MAP-Kinase Pathway. The CCR 3 Receptor interacts with multiple different ligands, such as MPC-2 and MPC-3. Both MPC-2 and MPC-3 have about a 50% similarity to eotaxin, which means that they both share parts of their structure with eotaxin, which likely plays a role in binding with the CCR-3 Receptor. Eotaxin is the only ligand that binds with the CCR-3 receptor exclusively.

== The Discovery ==
Eotaxin was discovered through the result of BAL injection and analysis in guinea pigs. After the analysis, they were able to see activity of an eosinophil chemoattractant. To determine the identity of this eosinophil chemoattractant, the scientists used micro-sequencing. After micro sequencing, they found a 73 amino acid chemokine, which is the protein we know as eotaxin. After more scientific research, they were able to find evidence of a human homologue of eotaxin. A primer was made from the guinea pig eotaxin in order to clone and isolate the eotaxin protein from different species. Within all the other species, eotaxin plays the role of being a strong chemoattractant for eosinophils. Also, there is greater than a 60% similarity of eotaxin among these different species. The discovery of eotaxin is also linked to a biological assay that was conducted on guinea pigs. This biological assay was designed to identify the molecules that were responsible for the allergen-induced eosinophil accumulation in the lungs. Through this assay, they were able to identify eotaxin as one of these proteins.

== Eotaxin and Its Relationship with Allergies ==
One way that eotaxin comes into our daily lives is through its relationship with allergies. In patients with allergic diseases, we can see that eosinophils selectively accumulate. These eosinophils are strong, pro-inflammatory effector cells. The cells involved in allergic responses, such as eosinophils, are predominantly expressed through eotaxin and the CCR-3 receptor. The binding of eotaxin and the other related chemokines to the CCR-3 receptor is seen to play a major role in eosinophil recruitment in allergic inflammation. We can find the highest levels of eotaxin in the lungs. Within these lung cells, the eotaxin levels are increased in a response to allergens.

== Eotaxin and Its Relationship with Asthma ==
There is research on eotaxin and its relationship with asthma. In asthma patients, there is an observed increase in the levels of eotaxin. The evidence of this comes from bronchial biopsies, where they have seen an increase of eotaxin levels in asthmatic individuals. The increased levels are associated with airway hyperresponsiveness. These levels have also been associated with airway obstruction. From the same research, they proposed that airway blockage correlates with the number of cells that express the mRNA for eotaxin within asthmatic individuals. When the airways of individuals with atopic asthma were compared to the airways of normal individuals, the atopic individuals have high concentrations of eotaxin within their BAL fluid. There was also an increase in the expression of mRNA and protein.
