= Macrophage inflammatory protein =

Protein family

chemokine (C-C motif) ligand 3
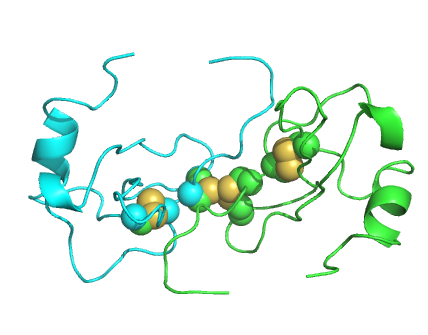
- Human Mip-1α dimer D26A mutant. PDB 1b53. Disulfide bonds highlighted.

Identifiers
- Symbol: CCL3
- Alt. symbols: SCYA3, MIP-1α
- NCBI gene: 6348
- HGNC: 10627
- OMIM: 182283
- PDB: 1B50 More structures
- RefSeq: NM_002983
- UniProt: P10147

Other data
- Locus: Chr. 17 q12
Search for
- Structures: Swiss-model
- Domains: InterPro

chemokine (C-C motif) ligand 4
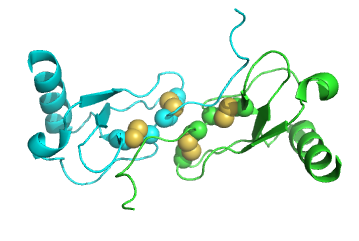
- Human Mip-1β dimer. PDB 1hum. Disulfide bonds highlighted.

Identifiers
- Symbol: CCL4
- Alt. symbols: SCYA4, MIP-1β, LAG1
- NCBI gene: 6351
- HGNC: 10630
- OMIM: 182284
- PDB: 1HUM More structures
- RefSeq: NM_002984
- UniProt: P13236

Other data
- Locus: Chr. 17 q21-q23
Search for
- Structures: Swiss-model
- Domains: InterPro

Macrophage Inflammatory Proteins (MIP) belong to the family of chemotactic cytokines known as chemokines. In humans, there are two major forms, MIP-1α and MIP-1β, renamed CCL3 and CCL4 respectively, since 2000. However, other names are sometimes encountered in older literature, such as LD78α, AT 464.1 and GOS19-1 for human CCL3 and AT 744, Act-2, LAG-1, HC21 and G-26 for human CCL4. Other macrophage inflammatory proteins include MIP-2, MIP-3 and MIP-5.

== MIP-1 ==
MIP-1α and MIP-1β are major factors produced by macrophages and monocytes after they are stimulated with bacterial endotoxin or proinflammatory cytokines such as IL-1β. But it appears that they can be expressed by all hematopoietic cells and some tissue cells such as fibroblasts, epithelial cells, vascular smooth muscle cells or platelets upon activation. They are crucial for immune responses towards infection and inflammation. CCL3 and CCL4 can bind to extracellular proteoglycans, which is not necessary for their function but it can enhance their bioactivity. The biological effect is carried out through ligation of chemokine receptors CCR1 (ligand CCL3) and CCR5 (ligands CCL3 and CCL4) and the signal is then transferred into the cell, thus these cytokines affect any cell that has these receptors. The main effect is inflammatory and mainly consists of chemotaxis and transendothelial migration but cells can be activated to release of some bioactive molecules also. These chemokines affect monocytes, T lymphocytes, dendritic cells, NK cells and platelets. They, too, activate human granulocytes (neutrophils, eosinophils and basophils) which can lead to acute neutrophilic inflammation. They also induce the synthesis and release of other pro-inflammatory cytokines such as interleukin 1 (IL-1), IL-6 and TNF-α from fibroblasts and macrophages. The genes for CCL3 and CCL4 are both located on human chromosome 17 and on murine chromosome 11.

They are produced by many cells, particularly macrophages, dendritic cells, and lymphocytes. MIP-1 are best known for their chemotactic and proinflammatory effects but can also promote homeostasis. Biophysical analyses and mathematical modelling has shown that MIP-1 reversibly forms a polydisperse distribution of rod-shaped polymers in solution. Polymerization buries receptor-binding sites of MIP-1, thus depolymerization mutations enhance MIP-1 to arrest monocytes onto activated human endothelium.

MIP-1γ is another macrophage inflammatory protein and according to the new nomenclature is named CCL9. It is produced mainly by follicle-associated epithelial cells and is responsible for chemotaxis of dendritic cells and macrophages into Peyer's patches in gut through binding of CCR1.

MIP-1δ or MIP-5 (CCL15) binds also CCR1 and CCR3.

== MIP-2 ==
MIP-2 belongs to the CXC chemokine family, is named CXCL2 and acts through binding of CXCR1 and CXCR2. It is produced mainly by macrophages, monocytes and epithelial cells and is responsible for chemotaxis to the source of inflammation and activation of neutrophils.

== MIP-3 ==
There are two chemokines in the MIP-3 group. MIP-3α (CCL20) and MIP-3β (CCL19).

MIP-3α is binding to receptor CCR6. CCL20 is produced by mucosa and skin by activated epithelial cells and attracts Th17 cells to the site of inflammation. It is also produced by Th17 cells themselves. It further attracts activated B cells, memory T cells and immature dendritic cells and has part in migration of these cells in secondary lymphoid organs. Mature dendritic cells down-regulate CCR6 and up-regulate CCR7, which is receptor for MIP-3β.

MIP-3β (CCL19) is produced by stromal cells in T-cell zones of secondary lymphoid organs and binds to CCR7 receptor through which attracts mature dendritic cells to lymph nodes. It is also produced by dendritic cells and attracts also naive T lymphocytes and B lymphocytes to homing into the lymph node, where antigens can be presented to them by dendritic cells.

== MIP-5 ==
MIP-5 (sometimes called MIP-1δ) or CCL15 binds to receptors CCR1 and CCR3. It has chemotactic properties for monocytes and eosinophils and is expressed by macrophages, basophils and some tissue cells. It is proposed to have a role in pathology of asthma.

== See also ==
- Chemokine
