= CCR1 =

Protein in humans

Identifiers
- Aliases: CCR1, CD191, CKR-1, CKR1, CMKBR1, HM145, MIP1aR, SCYAR1, C-C motif chemokine receptor 1
- External IDs: OMIM: 601159; MGI: 104618; GeneCards: CCR1
Available structures
PDB	Ortholog search: PDBe RCSB
PDB	List of PDB id codes 1Y5D

Gene location (Human)
Chr.	Chromosome 3 (human)
Band	3p21.31	Start	46,201,711 bp
Band	3p21.31	End	46,208,313 bp

Gene location (Mouse)
Chr.	Chromosome 9 (mouse)
Band	9 F4|9 75.05 cM	Start	123,762,161 bp
Band	9 F4|9 75.05 cM	End	123,768,729 bp
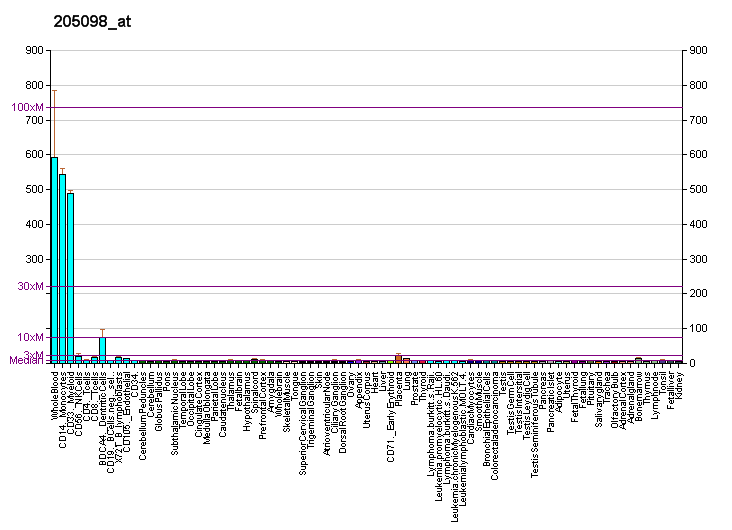

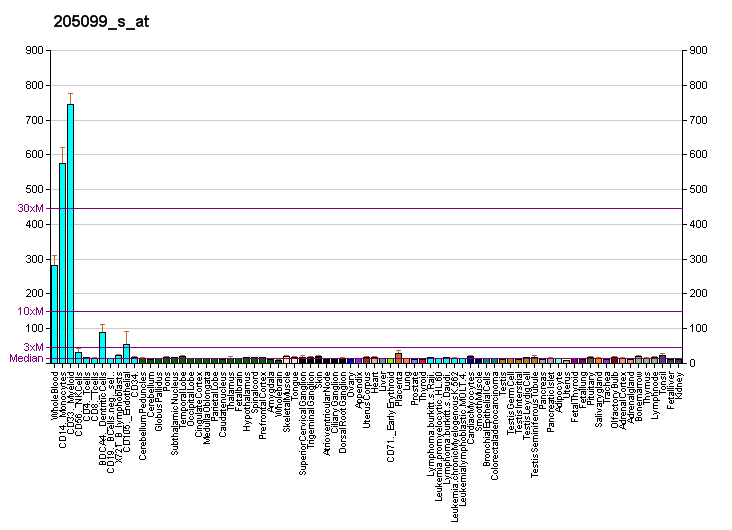
RNA expression pattern
Bgee	Human / Mouse (ortholog); Top expressed in: monocyte; blood; granulocyte; periodontal fiber; buccal mucosa cell; appendix; spleen; decidua; bone marrow; trabecular bone / Top expressed in: granulocyte; stroma of bone marrow; tibiofemoral joint; blood; ankle; body of femur; spleen; ankle joint; lumbar subsegment of spinal cord; duodenum; More reference expression data
BioGPS	More reference expression data
Gene ontology
Molecular function	C-C chemokine binding; G protein-coupled receptor activity; chemokine (C-C motif) ligand 5 binding; signal transducer activity; chemokine (C-C motif) ligand 7 binding; protein binding; chemokine receptor activity; C-C chemokine receptor activity; phosphatidylinositol phospholipase C activity; chemokine binding
Cellular component	integral component of membrane; membrane; plasma membrane; integral component of plasma membrane; external side of plasma membrane; cytoplasm
Biological process	negative regulation of bone mineralization; positive regulation of cell migration; positive regulation of cytosolic calcium ion concentration; chemokine-mediated signaling pathway; cell-cell signaling; G protein-coupled receptor signaling pathway, coupled to cyclic nucleotide second messenger; positive regulation of monocyte chemotaxis; cellular calcium ion homeostasis; positive regulation of osteoclast differentiation; dendritic cell chemotaxis; negative regulation of gene expression; chemotaxis; cell surface receptor signaling pathway; cell adhesion; response to wounding; immune response; positive regulation of ERK1 and ERK2 cascade; inflammatory response; calcium ion transport; signal transduction; exocytosis; positive regulation of calcium ion transport; G protein-coupled receptor signaling pathway; cytokine-mediated signaling pathway; calcium-mediated signaling; cell chemotaxis
Sources:Amigo / QuickGO
Orthologs
Databases	NCBI: entry; OMA: entry
Species	Human	Mouse
Entrez	1230	12768
Ensembl	ENSG00000163823	ENSMUSG00000025804
UniProt	P32246	P51675
RefSeq (mRNA)	NM_001295	NM_009912
RefSeq (protein)	NP_001286	NP_034042
Location (UCSC)	Chr 3: 46.2 – 46.21 Mb	Chr 9: 123.76 – 123.77 Mb
PubMed search
- Wikidata
View/Edit Human	View/Edit Mouse

C-C chemokine receptor type 1 is a protein that in humans is encoded by the CCR1 gene.

CCR1 has also recently been designated CD191 (cluster of differentiation 191).

== Function ==
This gene encodes a member of the beta chemokine receptor family, which belongs to G protein-coupled receptors. The ligands of this receptor include CCL3 (or MIP-1 alpha), CCL5 (or RANTES), CCL7 (or MCP-3), and CCL23 (or MPIF-1). Chemokines and their receptors, which mediate signal transduction, are critical for the recruitment of effector immune cells to the site of inflammation. Knockout studies of the mouse homolog suggested the roles of this gene in host protection from inflammatory response, and susceptibility to virus and parasite. This gene and other chemokine receptor genes, including CCR2, CCRL2, CCR3, CCR5 and CXCR1, are found to form a gene cluster on chromosome 3p.

== Interactions ==
CCR1 has been shown to interact with CCL5.
