= T helper cell 22 =

Type of immune cell

T helper cell 22, also known as the Th22 cell, are a type of immune cell. Th22 cells are a subset of naïve CD4+ T cells induced by the ligand activation of the transcription factor aryl hydrocarbon receptor (AhR), which uses environmental, metabolic, microbial, and dietary cues to control complex transcriptional programmes. Th22 cell function is mediated by its ligand specific cytokine interleukin-22 (IL-22).

== Differentiation and cytokine expression ==
Th22 cells were distinguished as their own class of T helper cells due to their production of IL-22, setting them apart from the key expression cytokines of IFN-gamma, IL-4, or IL-17 that are associated with Th1, Th2, and Th17 cells respectively. Th22 cell differentiation is stimulated by IL-6 and TNF-alpha, but others have found Th22 can be stimulated using Langerhans cells and dermal dendritic cells. Th22 cells are known to secrete IL-22, IL-13, IL-26, TNF-α, and granzyme B.

== In the immune response ==
Th22 cells express the chemokine receptors CCR4, CCR6, and CCR10 which direct the cells to barrier surfaces such as the skin and mucosal tissue. Th22 cells are also associated with the release of chemokines CXCL1, CXCL5, and CXCL9, which are associated with the recruitment of other inflammatory cells to the area.

IL-22 expression stimulates the growth of keratinocytes and epithelial cells, helping to maintain the innate barrier of skin and other organs. Similarly, IL-22, the characteristic cytokine produced by Th22 cells has little effect on immune cells and instead acts on mucosal barriers. Due to mucosal barrier interactions Th22 and subsequently IL-22 play a significant role in a variety of skin diseases, intestinal diseases, autoimmune diseases, and allergy conditions. Many of these diseases are characterized by increased circulation of Th22 cells and concomitant increased IL-22 expression.

In psoriasis, there is a positive feedback loop between Th22 and IL-22 expression. Increased expression of IL-22 is observed during lesion formation that augments the expression of anti-microbials and induces chemokine ligand (CCL)-20 recruiting CCR6, which is expressed on Th22 cells increasing their concentration in the lesion. Similarly, Th22 cells are found throughout the intestinal wall in irritable bowel diseases, facilitating IL-22 secretion and subsequent induction of tissue specific genes. Interestingly, Th22 cells induced expression of IL-22 in allergic asthma has been seen to have a protective effect against lung hypertension and tissue damage in murine models.
