= CCR3 =

Protein-coding gene in humans

Identifiers
- Aliases: CCR3, CC-CKR-3, CD193, CKR3, CMKBR3, C-C motif chemokine receptor 3, CKR 3, C C CKR3
- External IDs: OMIM: 601268; MGI: 104616; GeneCards: CCR3

Gene location (Human)
Chr.	Chromosome 3 (human)
Band	3p21.31	Start	46,130,890 bp
Band	3p21.31	End	46,266,706 bp

Gene location (Mouse)
Chr.	Chromosome 9 (mouse)
Band	9 F4|9 75.05 cM	Start	123,822,009 bp
Band	9 F4|9 75.05 cM	End	123,831,726 bp
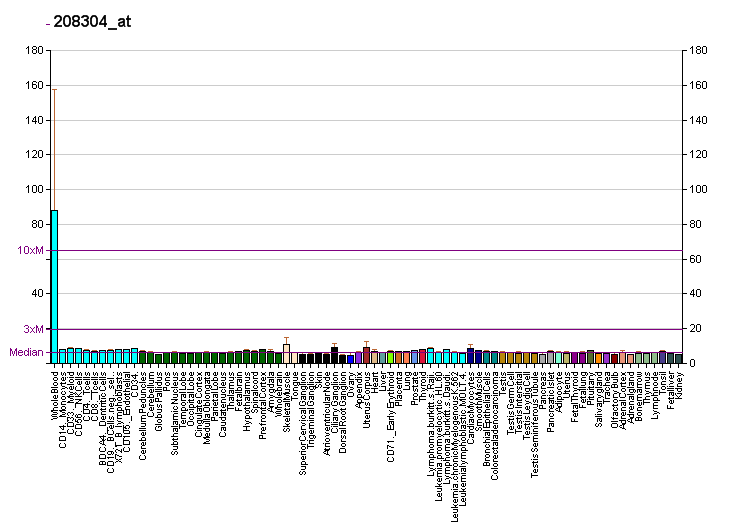
RNA expression pattern
Bgee	Human / Mouse (ortholog); Top expressed in: secondary oocyte; blood; muscle of thigh; monocyte; gallbladder; appendix; gonad; muscle of arm; biceps brachii; granulocyte / Top expressed in: embryo; spleen; granulocyte; zygote; intestinal villus; bone marrow; Ileal epithelium; secondary oocyte; blood; cervix; More reference expression data
BioGPS	More reference expression data
Gene ontology
Molecular function	G protein-coupled receptor activity; signal transducer activity; protein binding; C-C chemokine receptor activity; chemokine receptor activity; C-C chemokine binding; chemokine binding
Cellular component	integral component of membrane; membrane; integral component of plasma membrane; plasma membrane; cytoplasm; external side of plasma membrane
Biological process	positive regulation of endothelial cell proliferation; adenylate cyclase-modulating G protein-coupled receptor signaling pathway; positive regulation of cytosolic calcium ion concentration; chemokine-mediated signaling pathway; positive regulation of angiogenesis; chemotaxis; cellular defense response; cell adhesion; inflammatory response; viral process; signal transduction; G protein-coupled receptor signaling pathway; immune response; calcium-mediated signaling; cell chemotaxis
Sources:Amigo / QuickGO
Orthologs
Databases	NCBI: entry; OMA: entry
Species	Human	Mouse
Entrez	1232	12771
Ensembl	ENSG00000183625	ENSMUSG00000035448
UniProt	P51677	P51678
RefSeq (mRNA)	NM_001164680; NM_001837; NM_178328; NM_178329	NM_009914
RefSeq (protein)	NP_001158152; NP_001828; NP_847898; NP_847899	NP_034044
Location (UCSC)	Chr 3: 46.13 – 46.27 Mb	Chr 9: 123.82 – 123.83 Mb
PubMed search
- Wikidata
View/Edit Human	View/Edit Mouse

C-C chemokine receptor type 3 is a protein that in humans is encoded by the CCR3 gene.

CCR3 has also recently been designated CD193 (cluster of differentiation 193).

== Function ==
The protein encoded by this gene is a receptor for C-C type chemokines. It belongs to family 1 of the G protein-coupled receptors. This receptor binds and responds to a variety of chemokines, including eotaxin (CCL11), eotaxin-3 (CCL26), MCP-3 (CCL7), MCP-4 (CCL13), and RANTES (CCL5). It is highly expressed in eosinophils and basophils, and is also detected in TH1 and TH2 cells, as well as in airway epithelial cells. This receptor may contribute to the accumulation and activation of eosinophils and other inflammatory cells in the allergic airway, and possibly at sites of parasitic infection. It is also known to be an entry co-receptor for HIV-1, enabling viral infection in cells that also express CD4, the receptor of HIV-1. This gene and seven other chemokine receptor genes form a chemokine receptor gene cluster on the chromosomal region 3p21. Alternatively spliced transcript variants encoding the same protein have been described.

== See also ==
- Cluster of differentiation

== Interactions ==
CCR3 (gene) has been shown to interact with CCL5.
