= ZFAT-AS1 =

Identifiers
- Aliases: ZFAT-AS1, NCRNA00070, SAS-ZFAT, ZFAT-AS, ZFATAS, ZFAT antisense RNA 1
- External IDs: GeneCards: ZFAT-AS1

Gene location (Human)
Chr.	Chromosome 8 (human)
Band	8q24.22	Start	134,598,071 bp
Band	8q24.22	End	134,600,689 bp
RNA expression pattern
Bgee	Human / Mouse (ortholog); Top expressed in: bone marrow cell; liver; lung; muscle of thigh; renal cortex; reproductive organ; blood; monocyte; placenta; lymph node / n/a; More reference expression data
BioGPS	n/a
Orthologs
Databases	NCBI: entry; OMA: entry
Species	Human	Mouse
Entrez	594840	n/a
Ensembl	ENSG00000248492	n/a
UniProt	n a	n/a
RefSeq (mRNA)	n/a	n/a
RefSeq (protein)	n/a	n/a
Location (UCSC)	Chr 8: 134.6 – 134.6 Mb	n/a
PubMed search		n/a
- Wikidata
View/Edit Human

In molecular biology, ZFAT antisense RNA 1 (non-protein coding), also known as ZFAT-AS1, is a long non-coding RNA. In peripheral blood lymphocytes, it is expressed in CD19+ B-cells. It is an antisense transcript of the ZFAT gene, and negatively regulates the expression of a truncated form of ZFAT, TR-ZFAT, but not of ZFAT. A single nucleotide polymorphism (SNP) which is located in the 3'-UTR of TR-ZFAT and the promoter region of ZFAT-AS1 regulates the expression of ZFAT-AS1, and therefore also affects expression of TR-ZFAT. This SNP is associated with an increased risk of autoimmune thyroid disease.

== See also ==
- Long noncoding RNA
