= CCL15 =

Mammalian protein found in humans

Identifiers
- Aliases: CCL15, HCC-2, HMRP-2B, LKN-1, LKN1, MIP-1 delta, MIP-1D, MIP-5, MRP-2B, NCC-3, NCC3, SCYA15, SCYL3, SY15, C-C motif chemokine ligand 15
- External IDs: OMIM: 601393; GeneCards: CCL15
Available structures
PDB	Human UniProt search: PDBe RCSB
PDB	List of PDB id codes 2HCC

Gene location (Human)
Chr.	Chromosome 17 (human)
Band	17q12	Start	35,996,440 bp
Band	17q12	End	36,001,553 bp
RNA expression pattern
Bgee	Human / Mouse (ortholog); Top expressed in: mucosa of transverse colon; rectum; duodenum; right lobe of liver; olfactory zone of nasal mucosa; gallbladder; right uterine tube; right lung; human kidney; appendix / n/a; More reference expression data
BioGPS	n/a
Gene ontology
Molecular function	cytokine activity; heparin binding; CCR chemokine receptor binding; chemoattractant activity; signaling receptor binding; chemokine activity
Cellular component	extracellular region; extracellular space
Biological process	G protein-coupled receptor signaling pathway; monocyte chemotaxis; chemokine-mediated signaling pathway; cell-cell signaling; cellular response to tumor necrosis factor; cellular calcium ion homeostasis; neutrophil chemotaxis; chemotaxis; positive regulation of GTPase activity; cellular response to interleukin-1; immune response; positive regulation of ERK1 and ERK2 cascade; cellular response to interferon-gamma; cell chemotaxis; lymphocyte chemotaxis; inflammatory response; signal transduction; positive chemotaxis; regulation of signaling receptor activity; eosinophil chemotaxis
Sources:Amigo / QuickGO
Orthologs
Databases	NCBI: entry; OMA: entry
Species	Human	Mouse
Entrez	6359	n/a
Ensembl	ENSG00000275718; ENSG00000275528	n/a
UniProt	Q16663	n/a
RefSeq (mRNA)	NM_032965; NM_004167; NM_032964	n/a
RefSeq (protein)	NP_116741	n/a
Location (UCSC)	Chr 17: 36 – 36 Mb	n/a
PubMed search		n/a
- Wikidata
View/Edit Human

Chemokine (C-C motif) ligand 15 (CCL15) is a small cytokine belonging to the CC chemokine family that is also known as leukotactin-1, MIP5 and HCC-2. CCL15 is expressed in liver, small intestine, colon, and in certain leukocytes and macrophages of the lung. It is chemotactic for neutrophils, monocytes, and lymphocytes and elicits its effects by binding to cell surface chemokine receptors like CCR1 and CCR3. The human CCL15 gene spans four exons and is located in a head-to-tail orientation on chromosome 17 with the gene of another CC chemokine known as CCL14.
