= CCR9 =

Protein-coding gene in humans

Identifiers
- Aliases: CCR9, CC-CKR-9, CDw199, GPR-9-6, GPR28, C-C motif chemokine receptor 9
- External IDs: OMIM: 604738; MGI: 1341902; GeneCards: CCR9

Gene location (Human)
Chr.	Chromosome 3 (human)
Band	3p21.31	Start	45,886,509 bp
Band	3p21.31	End	45,903,174 bp

Gene location (Mouse)
Chr.	Chromosome 9 (mouse)
Band	9 F4|9 74.33 cM	Start	123,507,504 bp
Band	9 F4|9 74.33 cM	End	123,613,395 bp
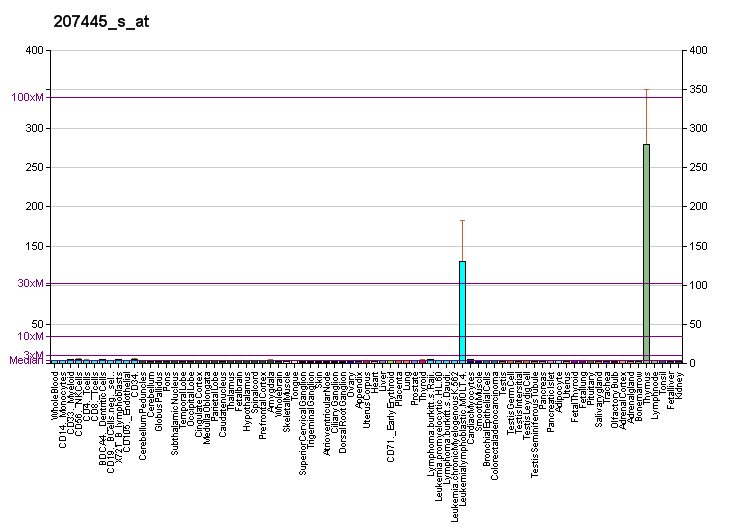
RNA expression pattern
Bgee	Human / Mouse (ortholog); Top expressed in: thymus; duodenum; granulocyte; sural nerve; appendix; blood; bone marrow; spleen; mucosa of transverse colon; monocyte / Top expressed in: thymus; mesenteric lymph nodes; blood; spleen; external carotid artery; ascending aorta; aortic valve; bone marrow; duodenum; jejunum; More reference expression data
BioGPS	More reference expression data
Gene ontology
Molecular function	C-C chemokine receptor activity; G protein-coupled receptor activity; signal transducer activity; chemokine receptor activity; chemokine binding; C-C chemokine binding
Cellular component	cell surface; integral component of membrane; integral component of plasma membrane; membrane; plasma membrane; intracellular anatomical structure; external side of plasma membrane
Biological process	positive regulation of cytosolic calcium ion concentration; chemotaxis; chemokine-mediated signaling pathway; cellular defense response; G protein-coupled receptor signaling pathway; immune response; signal transduction; CD8-positive, gamma-delta intraepithelial T cell differentiation; calcium-mediated signaling; cell chemotaxis
Sources:Amigo / QuickGO
Orthologs
Databases	NCBI: entry; OMA: entry
Species	Human	Mouse
Entrez	10803	12769
Ensembl	ENSG00000173585	ENSMUSG00000029530
UniProt	P51686	Q9WUT7
RefSeq (mRNA)	NM_001256369; NM_006641; NM_031200; NM_001386447; NM_001386448	NM_001166625; NM_009913
RefSeq (protein)	NP_001243298; NP_006632; NP_112477	NP_001160097; NP_034043
Location (UCSC)	Chr 3: 45.89 – 45.9 Mb	Chr 9: 123.51 – 123.61 Mb
PubMed search
- Wikidata
View/Edit Human	View/Edit Mouse

C-C chemokine receptor type 9 is a protein that in humans is encoded by the CCR9 gene. This gene is mapped to the chemokine receptor gene cluster region. Two alternatively spliced transcript variants have been described.

CCR9 has also recently been designated CDw199 (cluster of differentiation w199).

The protein encoded by this gene is a member of the beta chemokine receptor family. CCR9 is a seven transmembrane protein similar to G protein-coupled receptors.

== Function ==
Chemokines and their receptors, such as CCR9 and its binding agonist, are key regulators of thymocyte migration and maturation in normal and inflammatory conditions. The specific agonist or ligand that binds CCR9 is CCL25 also referred to as TECK in some literature. The effects of chemokines binding to their specific receptors is generally dependent on the structural placement of the N terminal cysteine(s) amino acids. Receptors are broken down into 4 family groups CXC, CC, C, and CX3C, because CCR9 has two adjacent cysteines it is a C-C family receptor. C-C family chemokines (such as CCL25) are often associated with the recruitment of lymphocytes. It has been found that this gene is differentially expressed by T lymphocytes of small intestine and colon, suggesting a role in thymocyte recruitment and development that may permit functional specialization of immune responses in different segments of the gastrointestinal tract.

== Clinical significance ==
The breadth of effects following interactions of CCR9 and its binding ligand CCL25 are vast and not completely understood, however, it is generally thought that CCR9 and CCL25 play substantial roles in cancer proliferation and inflammatory diseases. The location of CCR9 and CCL25 expression plays a substantial role in how it contributes to diseases. For example, the high expression of CCL25 in the epithelial lining of the small intestine, has contributed to its strong association and influence on inflammatory disease of the gut such as inflammatory bowel disease. However, CCR9 and CCL25 have also been associated with other inflammatory conditions such as cardiovascular disease, rheumatoid arthritis, and asthma. The role of CCR9 in cancer lies primarily in its ability to upregulate cell proliferation, metastasis, and the drug resistance.

=== Inflammatory Bowel Disease (IBD) ===
CCR9/CCL25 interactions are known to contribute to the up-regulated migration of memory T cell homing to the gut given high expression of CCL25 in intestinal lining. As a result, it is suggested that CCR9 and CCL25 have been a key focus in promoting a balanced pro-inflammatory and anti-inflammatory response in the gut. It has been observed that decreased expression of CCL25 and CCR9 contributes to macrophage recruitment in the gut as well as inflammatory cytokines which induces the observed inflammation in IBD. The inflammatory cytokines upregulated in the immune response of IBD are TNF-α, IFN-γ, IL-2, IL-6, IL-17A, and Th1/Th17. Overall, it is likely that the interactions of CCR9 and CCL25 provide substantial protections against large intestinal inflammation via its ability to regulate inflammation in the gut by balancing the presence of inflammatory cytokines.

=== Myocardial Infarction (MI) ===
CCR9/CCL25 interaction reduction is believed to improve the survival rate, cardiac function, and reduce infarct size following myocardial infarctions. Additionally, reduced CCR9 expression following myocardial infarctions is also believed to attenuate apoptosis in the cells of the affected cardiac tissue while also reducing inflammation through the down-regulation of inflammatory cytokines including: IL-1β, IL-6, and TNF-α. Overall, CCR9 and CCL25 are believed to play a key role in mitigating the damage to cardiac tissue following heart attacks, while also aiding cardiac remodeling. The role CCR9 and CCL25 is thought to have in cardiovascular health has made it a key area of focus in clinical research.

=== Cancer ===
CCR9/CCL25 interaction is believed to significantly influence the cellular functions of cancer cells and ultimately contribute to their proliferation and metastasis. CCR9 and CCL25 interactions are understood to suppress apoptosis observed by cancer cells. Apoptosis in cancer cells is an essential mechanism utilized to mitigate the proliferation of cancer cells. The suggested reduction in apoptosis observed in cancer cells as a result of CCR9 and CCL25 interactions, ultimately supports the proliferation and metastasis of cancer cells. The observed proliferative and antiapoptotic effects of CCR9/CCL25 interaction, suggests the potential for targeted therapies that down-regulate CCR9/CCL25 for certain cancers including: leukemia, prostate cancer, breast cancer, ovarian cancer and lung cancer.
