= CCL16 =

Mammalian protein found in humans

Identifiers
- Aliases: CCL16, CKb12, HCC-4, ILINCK, LCC-1, LEC, LMC, Mtn-1, NCC-4, NCC4, SCYA16, SCYL4, C-C motif chemokine ligand 16
- External IDs: OMIM: 601394; GeneCards: CCL16

Gene location (Human)
Chr.	Chromosome 17 (human)
Band	17q12	Start	35,976,493 bp
Band	17q12	End	35,981,497 bp
RNA expression pattern
Bgee	Human / Mouse (ortholog); Top expressed in: liver; right lobe of liver; spleen; myometrium; canal of the cervix; body of uterus; subcutaneous adipose tissue; smooth muscle tissue; lactiferous gland; ectocervix / n/a; More reference expression data
BioGPS	n/a
Gene ontology
Molecular function	cytokine activity; CCR chemokine receptor binding; chemoattractant activity; chemokine activity; protein binding
Cellular component	extracellular region; extracellular space
Biological process	monocyte chemotaxis; chemokine-mediated signaling pathway; cell-cell signaling; cellular response to tumor necrosis factor; neutrophil chemotaxis; chemotaxis; cell communication; positive regulation of GTPase activity; cellular response to interleukin-1; immune response; positive regulation of ERK1 and ERK2 cascade; cellular response to interferon-gamma; lymphocyte chemotaxis; inflammatory response; positive chemotaxis; regulation of signaling receptor activity; G protein-coupled receptor signaling pathway; eosinophil chemotaxis
Sources:Amigo / QuickGO
Orthologs
Databases	NCBI: entry; OMA: entry
Species	Human	Mouse
Entrez	6360	n/a
Ensembl	ENSG00000275152; ENSG00000275095	n/a
UniProt	O15467	n/a
RefSeq (mRNA)	NM_004590	n/a
RefSeq (protein)	NP_004581	n/a
Location (UCSC)	Chr 17: 35.98 – 35.98 Mb	n/a
PubMed search		n/a
- Wikidata
View/Edit Human

Chemokine (C-C motif) ligand 16 (CCL16) is a small cytokine belonging to the CC chemokine family that is known under several pseudonyms, including Liver-expressed chemokine (LEC) and Monotactin-1 (MTN-1). This chemokine is expressed by the liver, thymus, and spleen and is chemoattractive for monocytes and lymphocytes. Cellular expression of CCL16 can be strongly induced in monocytes by IL-10, IFN-γ and bacterial lipopolysaccharide. Its gene is located on chromosome 17, in humans, among a cluster of other CC chemokines. CCL16 elicits its effects on cells by interacting with cell surface chemokine receptors such as CCR1, CCR2, CCR5 and CCR8.

C-C motif chemokine ligand 16 has been found in high levels in the blood plasma of humans. CCL16 may be useful for trafficking eosinophils. This ligand has been found to have a functional affinity for H4 receptors that are expressed by eosinophils and mast cells. This chemokine has been shown to suppress rapid proliferation of myeloid progenitor cells.
