= CCL8 =

Mammalian protein found in humans

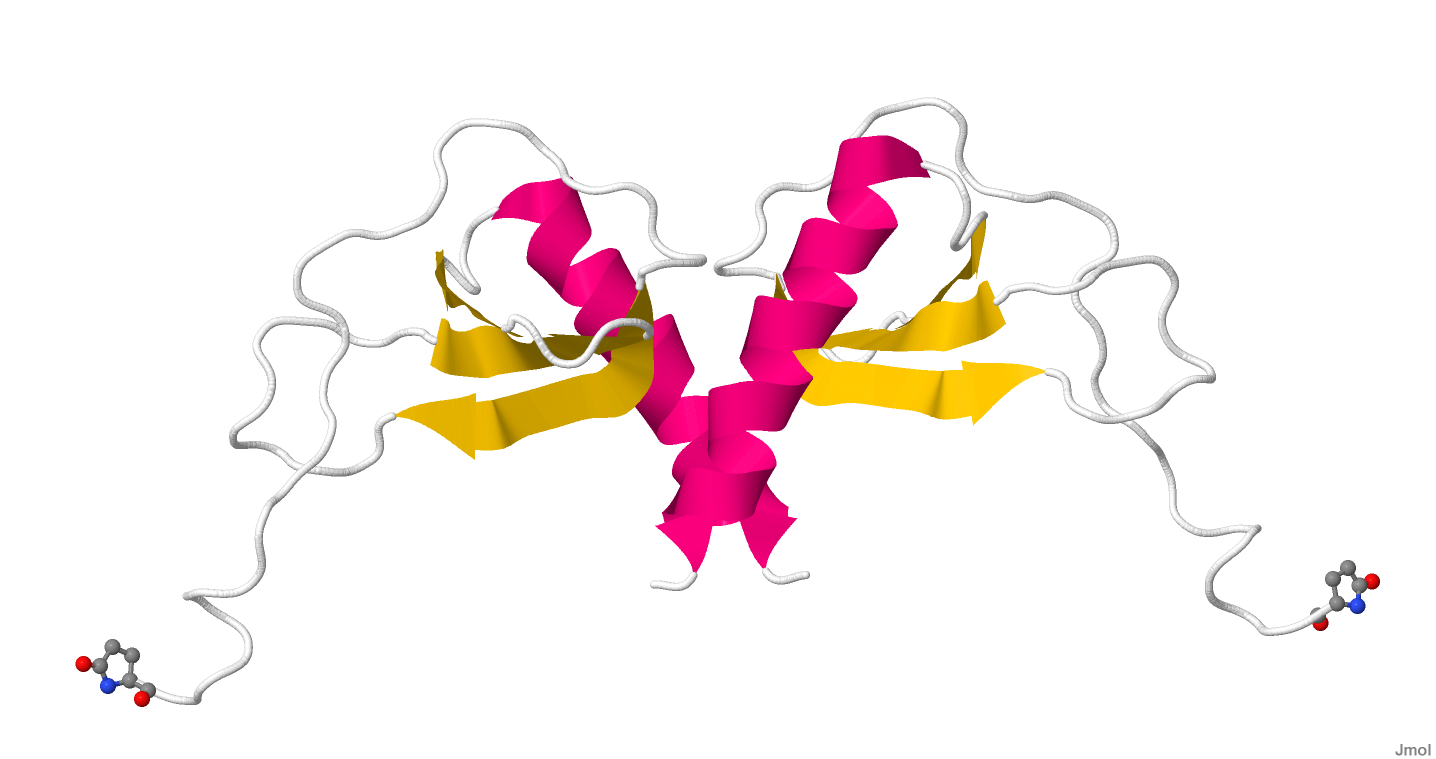

Identifiers
- Aliases: CCL8, HC14, MCP-2, MCP2, SCYA10, SCYA8, C-C motif chemokine ligand 8
- External IDs: OMIM: 602283; GeneCards: CCL8
Available structures
PDB	Human UniProt search: PDBe RCSB
PDB	List of PDB id codes 1ESR

Gene location (Human)
Chr.	Chromosome 17 (human)
Band	17q12	Start	34,319,435 bp
Band	17q12	End	34,321,402 bp
RNA expression pattern
Bgee	Human / Mouse (ortholog); Top expressed in: testicle; buccal mucosa cell; vena cava; parietal pleura; mucosa of transverse colon; epithelium of colon; decidua; rectum; lactiferous duct; superficial temporal artery / n/a; More reference expression data
BioGPS	n/a
Gene ontology
Molecular function	protein kinase activity; cytokine activity; heparin binding; phospholipase activator activity; CCR chemokine receptor binding; chemokine activity; protein binding; CCR2 chemokine receptor binding
Cellular component	extracellular region; extracellular space
Biological process	G protein-coupled receptor signaling pathway; monocyte chemotaxis; chemokine-mediated signaling pathway; cellular response to tumor necrosis factor; cell-cell signaling; response to virus; cellular calcium ion homeostasis; neutrophil chemotaxis; chemotaxis; positive regulation of GTPase activity; cellular response to interleukin-1; immune response; positive regulation of ERK1 and ERK2 cascade; cellular response to interferon-gamma; lymphocyte chemotaxis; inflammatory response; calcium ion transport; signal transduction; exocytosis; protein phosphorylation; antimicrobial humoral immune response mediated by antimicrobial peptide; positive regulation of leukocyte migration; negative regulation of leukocyte proliferation; regulation of signaling receptor activity; angiogenesis; eosinophil chemotaxis
Sources:Amigo / QuickGO
Orthologs
Databases	NCBI: entry; OMA: entry
Species	Human	Mouse
Entrez	6355	n/a
Ensembl	ENSG00000108700	n/a
UniProt	P80075	n/a
RefSeq (mRNA)	NM_005623	n/a
RefSeq (protein)	NP_005614	n/a
Location (UCSC)	Chr 17: 34.32 – 34.32 Mb	n/a
PubMed search		n/a
- Wikidata
View/Edit Human

Chemokine (C-C motif) ligand 8 (CCL8), also known as monocyte chemoattractant protein 2 (MCP2), is a protein that in humans is encoded by the CCL8 gene.

CCL8 is a small cytokine belonging to the CC chemokine family. The CCL8 protein is produced as a precursor containing 109 amino acids, which is cleaved to produce mature CCL8 containing 75 amino acids. The gene for CCL8 is encoded by 3 exons and is located within a large cluster of CC chemokines on chromosome 17q11.2 in humans. MCP-2 is chemotactic for and activates many different immune cells, including mast cells, eosinophils and basophils, (that are implicated in allergic responses), and monocytes, T cells, and NK cells that are involved in the inflammatory response. CCL8 elicits its effects by binding to several different cell surface receptors called chemokine receptors. These receptors include CCR1, CCR2B, CCR3 and CCR5.

CCL8 is a CC chemokine that utilizes multiple cellular receptors to attract and activate human leukocytes. CCL8 is a potent inhibitor of HIV1 by virtue of its high-affinity binding to the receptor CCR5, one of the major co-receptors for HIV1. In addition, CCL8 attributes to the growth of metastasis in breast cancer cells. The manipulation of this chemokine activity influences the histology of tumors promoting steps of metastatic processes. CCL8 is also involved in attracting macrophages to the decidua in labor.
