= CCL14 =

Mammalian protein found in humans

Identifiers
- Aliases: CCL14, CC-1, CC-3, CKB1, HCC-1, HCC-1(1-74), HCC-1/HCC-3, HCC-3, MCIF, NCC-2, NCC2, SCYA14, SCYL2, SY14, C-C motif chemokine ligand 14
- External IDs: OMIM: 601392; GeneCards: CCL14
Available structures
PDB	Human UniProt search: PDBe RCSB
PDB	List of PDB id codes 2Q8R, 2Q8T

Gene location (Human)
Chr.	Chromosome 17 (human)
Band	17q12	Start	35,983,288 bp
Band	17q12	End	35,987,004 bp
RNA expression pattern
Bgee	Human / Mouse (ortholog); Top expressed in: spleen; subcutaneous adipose tissue; left uterine tube; lactiferous gland; gastric mucosa; canal of the cervix; body of uterus; myometrium; smooth muscle tissue; olfactory zone of nasal mucosa / n/a; More reference expression data
BioGPS	n/a
Gene ontology
Molecular function	chemokine activity; cytokine activity; CCR chemokine receptor binding
Cellular component	extracellular region; extracellular space
Biological process	chemokine-mediated signaling pathway; lymphocyte chemotaxis; cellular response to tumor necrosis factor; G protein-coupled receptor signaling pathway; positive regulation of GTPase activity; inflammatory response; cellular calcium ion homeostasis; cellular response to interleukin-1; monocyte chemotaxis; neutrophil chemotaxis; positive regulation of cell population proliferation; positive regulation of ERK1 and ERK2 cascade; immune response; cellular response to interferon-gamma; regulation of signaling receptor activity; positive regulation of inflammatory response
Sources:Amigo / QuickGO
Orthologs
Databases	NCBI: entry; OMA: entry
Species	Human	Mouse
Entrez	6358	n/a
Ensembl	ENSG00000277236; ENSG00000276409	n/a
UniProt	Q16627	n/a
RefSeq (mRNA)	NM_032963; NM_004166; NM_032962	n/a
RefSeq (protein)	NP_116738; NP_116739	n/a
Location (UCSC)	Chr 17: 35.98 – 35.99 Mb	n/a
PubMed search		n/a
- Wikidata
View/Edit Human

Chemokine (C-C motif) ligand 14 (CCL14) is a small cytokine belonging to the CC chemokine family. It is also commonly known as HCC-1. It is produced as a protein precursor that is processed to generate a mature active protein containing 74 amino acids that and is 46% identical in amino acid composition to CCL3 and CCL4. This chemokine is expressed in various tissues including spleen, bone marrow, liver, muscle, and gut. CCL14 activates monocytes, but does not induce their chemotaxis. Human CCL14 is located on chromosome 17 within a cluster of other chemokines belonging to the CC family.
