= CCL13 =

Mammalian protein found in humans

Identifiers
- Aliases: CCL13, CKb10, MCP-4, NCC-1, NCC1, SCYA13, SCYL1, C-C motif chemokine ligand 13
- External IDs: OMIM: 601391; MGI: 98259; GeneCards: CCL13
Available structures
PDB	Ortholog search: PDBe RCSB
PDB	List of PDB id codes 2RA4

Gene location (Human)
Chr.	Chromosome 17 (human)
Band	17q12	Start	34,356,480 bp
Band	17q12	End	34,358,610 bp

Gene location (Mouse)
Chr.	Chromosome 11 (mouse)
Band	11 C|11 49.82 cM	Start	82,035,571 bp
Band	11 C|11 49.82 cM	End	82,037,453 bp
RNA expression pattern
Bgee	Human / Mouse (ortholog); Top expressed in: gonad; mucosa of transverse colon; decidua; tibial nerve; epithelium of colon; tendon of biceps brachii; rectum; Achilles tendon; duodenum; right adrenal cortex / Top expressed in: endothelial cell of lymphatic vessel; stroma of bone marrow; spermatid; embryo; cranial nervi; trigeminal nerve; ophthalmic nerve; interventricular septum; sciatic nerve; inner muscle layer; More reference expression data
BioGPS	n/a
Gene ontology
Molecular function	cytokine activity; chemokine activity; CCR chemokine receptor binding; signaling receptor binding; protein binding
Cellular component	extracellular region; extracellular space
Biological process	monocyte chemotaxis; cell-cell signaling; eosinophil chemotaxis; chemotaxis; positive regulation of GTPase activity; cytoskeleton organization; immune response; positive regulation of ERK1 and ERK2 cascade; regulation of cell shape; signal transduction; inflammatory response; antimicrobial humoral immune response mediated by antimicrobial peptide; cellular calcium ion homeostasis; neutrophil chemotaxis; lymphocyte chemotaxis; chemokine-mediated signaling pathway; cellular response to interferon-gamma; cellular response to interleukin-1; cellular response to tumor necrosis factor; regulation of signaling receptor activity; G protein-coupled receptor signaling pathway; cell chemotaxis
Sources:Amigo / QuickGO
Orthologs
Databases	NCBI: entry; OMA: entry
Species	Human	Mouse
Entrez	6357	20296
Ensembl	ENSG00000181374	ENSMUSG00000035385
UniProt	Q99616	P10148
RefSeq (mRNA)	NM_005408	NM_011333
RefSeq (protein)	NP_005399	NP_035463
Location (UCSC)	Chr 17: 34.36 – 34.36 Mb	Chr 11: 82.04 – 82.04 Mb
PubMed search
- Wikidata
View/Edit Human	View/Edit Mouse

Chemokine (C-C motif) ligand 13 (CCL13) is a small cytokine belonging to the CC chemokine family. Its gene is located on human chromosome 17 within a large cluster of other CC chemokines. CCL13 induces chemotaxis in monocytes, eosinophils, T lymphocytes, and basophils by binding cell surface G-protein linked chemokine receptors such as CCR2, CCR3 and CCR5. Activity of this chemokine has been implicated in allergic reactions such as asthma. CCL13 can be induced by the inflammatory cytokines interleukin-1 and TNF-α.
