= CCL25 =

Mammalian protein found in humans

Identifiers
- Aliases: CCL25, Ckb15, SCYA25, TECK, C-C motif chemokine ligand 25, Ck beta-15
- External IDs: OMIM: 602565; MGI: 1099448; GeneCards: CCL25

Gene location (Human)
Chr.	Chromosome 19 (human)
Band	19p13.2	Start	8,052,318 bp
Band	19p13.2	End	8,062,660 bp

Gene location (Mouse)
Chr.	Chromosome 8 (mouse)
Band	8 A1.1|8 2.01 cM	Start	4,325,210 bp
Band	8 A1.1|8 2.01 cM	End	4,360,020 bp
RNA expression pattern
Bgee	Human / Mouse (ortholog); Top expressed in: duodenum; thymus; gonad; lymph node; appendix; bone marrow cell; mucosa of transverse colon; granulocyte; spleen; temporal lobe / Top expressed in: thymus; duodenum; jejunum; ileum; crypt of lieberkuhn of small intestine; intestinal epithelium; epithelium of small intestine; intestinal villus; migratory enteric neural crest cell; Paneth cell; More reference expression data
BioGPS	n/a
Gene ontology
Molecular function	CCR10 chemokine receptor binding; chemokine receptor binding; cytokine activity; hormone activity; chemokine activity; protein binding; CCR chemokine receptor binding
Cellular component	extracellular region; extracellular space
Biological process	negative regulation of leukocyte tethering or rolling; G protein-coupled receptor signaling pathway; monocyte chemotaxis; positive regulation of cell-matrix adhesion; chemokine-mediated signaling pathway; cellular response to tumor necrosis factor; neutrophil chemotaxis; chemotaxis; positive regulation of GTPase activity; cell surface receptor signaling pathway; immune response; cellular response to interleukin-1; positive regulation of ERK1 and ERK2 cascade; cellular response to interferon-gamma; cell chemotaxis; lymphocyte chemotaxis; inflammatory response; antimicrobial humoral immune response mediated by antimicrobial peptide; regulation of signaling receptor activity
Sources:Amigo / QuickGO
Orthologs
Databases	NCBI: entry; OMA: entry
Species	Human	Mouse
Entrez	6370	20300
Ensembl	ENSG00000131142	ENSMUSG00000023235
UniProt	O15444	O35903
RefSeq (mRNA)	NM_001201359; NM_005624; NM_148888; NM_001394634; NM_001394635 NM_001394636; NM_001394637; NM_001394638	NM_009138
RefSeq (protein)	NP_001188288; NP_005615	NP_033164
Location (UCSC)	Chr 19: 8.05 – 8.06 Mb	Chr 8: 4.33 – 4.36 Mb
PubMed search
- Wikidata
View/Edit Human	View/Edit Mouse

Chemokine (C-C motif) ligand 25 (CCL25) is a small cytokine belonging to the CC chemokine family that is also known as TECK (Thymus-Expressed Chemokine). CCL25 is believed to play a role in the development of T-cells. It is chemotactic for thymocytes, macrophages, and dendritic cells. CCL25 elicits its effects by binding to the chemokine receptor CCR9. Human CCL25 is produced as a protein precursor containing 151 amino acids. The gene for CCL25 (scya25) is located on human chromosome 19.
