= CCL6 =

Protein fragments in rodents

chemokine (C-C motif) ligand 6

Identifiers
- Symbol: CCL6
- Alt. symbols: SCYA6, C10, MRP-1
- NCBI gene: 20305
- RefSeq: NM_009139
- UniProt: P27784

Other data
- Locus: Chr. 11
Search for
- Structures: Swiss-model
- Domains: InterPro

Chemokine (C-C motif) ligand 6 (CCL6) is a small cytokine belonging to the CC chemokine family that has only been identified in rodents.

In mice, CCL6 is expressed in cells from neutrophil and macrophage lineages, and can be greatly induced under conditions suitable for myeloid cell differentiation. It is highly expressed in bone marrow cultures that have been stimulated with the cytokine GM-CSF. Some low levels of gene expression also occur in certain cell lines of myeloid origin (e.g. the immature myeloid cell lines DA3 and 32D cl3, and the macrophage cell line P388D) that can also be greatly induced in culture with GM-CSF. However, in activated T cell lines, expression of CCL6 is greatly reduced. CCL6 can also be induced in the mouse lung by the cytokine interleukin 13. Mouse CCL6 is located on chromosome 11. The cell surface receptor for CCL6 is believed to be the chemokine receptor CCR1.
