= CCR10 =

Protein-coding gene in humans

Identifiers
- Aliases: CCR10, GPR2, C-C motif chemokine receptor 10
- External IDs: OMIM: 600240; MGI: 1096320; GeneCards: CCR10

Gene location (Human)
Chr.	Chromosome 17 (human)
Band	17q21.2	Start	42,678,889 bp
Band	17q21.2	End	42,683,917 bp

Gene location (Mouse)
Chr.	Chromosome 11 (mouse)
Band	11 D|11 64.34 cM	Start	101,063,823 bp
Band	11 D|11 64.34 cM	End	101,066,269 bp
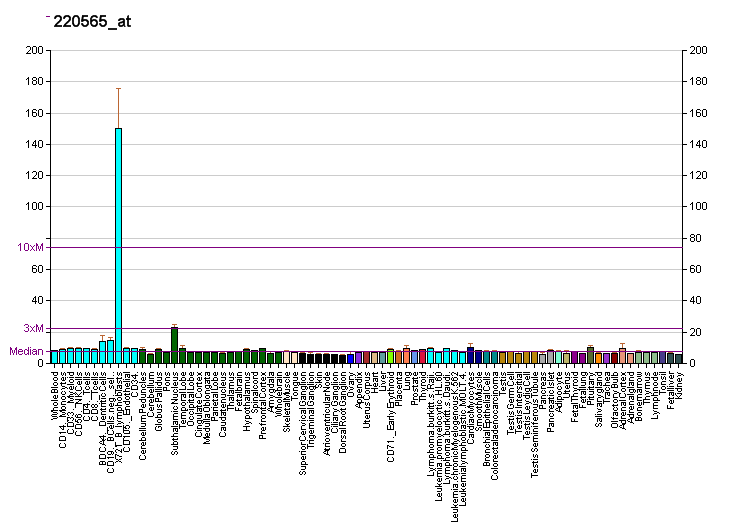
RNA expression pattern
Bgee	Human / Mouse (ortholog); Top expressed in: sural nerve; pituitary gland; anterior pituitary; right hemisphere of cerebellum; body of uterus; left uterine tube; apex of heart; canal of the cervix; left ovary; right ovary / Top expressed in: embryo; embryo; esophagus; duodenum; granulocyte; neural layer of retina; lip; jejunum; muscle tissue; cerebellar cortex; More reference expression data
BioGPS	More reference expression data
Gene ontology
Molecular function	C-C chemokine receptor activity; G protein-coupled receptor activity; chemokine receptor activity; signal transducer activity; protein binding; chemokine binding; C-C chemokine binding
Cellular component	cell surface; integral component of membrane; plasma membrane; integral component of plasma membrane; membrane; endoplasmic reticulum; external side of plasma membrane
Biological process	positive regulation of cytosolic calcium ion concentration; chemotaxis; chemokine-mediated signaling pathway; G protein-coupled receptor signaling pathway; immune response; signal transduction; calcium-mediated signaling; cell chemotaxis
Sources:Amigo / QuickGO
Orthologs
Databases	NCBI: entry; OMA: entry
Species	Human	Mouse
Entrez	2826	12777
Ensembl	ENSG00000184451	ENSMUSG00000044052
UniProt	P46092	Q9JL21
RefSeq (mRNA)	NM_016602	NM_007721
RefSeq (protein)	NP_057686	NP_031747
Location (UCSC)	Chr 17: 42.68 – 42.68 Mb	Chr 11: 101.06 – 101.07 Mb
PubMed search
- Wikidata
View/Edit Human	View/Edit Mouse

C-C chemokine receptor type 10 is a protein that in humans is encoded by the CCR10 gene.

== Function ==
Chemokines are a group of small (approximately 8 to 14 kD), mostly basic, structurally related molecules that regulate cell trafficking of various types of leukocytes through interactions with a subset of 7-transmembrane, G protein-coupled receptors. Chemokines also play fundamental roles in the development, homeostasis, and function of the immune system, and they have effects on cells of the central nervous system as well as on endothelial cells involved in angiogenesis or angiostasis. Chemokines are divided into 2 major subfamilies, CXC and CC, based on the arrangement of the first 2 of the 4 conserved cysteine residues; the 2 cysteines are separated by a single amino acid in CXC chemokines and are adjacent in CC chemokines.

CCR10 is a chemokine receptor. Its ligands are CCL27 and CCL28. This receptor is normally expressed by melanocytes, plasma cells and skin-homing T cells. B16 melanoma cell transduction of CCR10 significantly increases the development of lymph node metastasis in mice after inoculation in the skin, suggesting a role for the receptor in directing metastasis. CCR10-CCL27 interactions are involved in T cell-mediated skin inflammation.
