= C-C motif chemokine ligand 27 =

Mammalian protein found in humans

CCL27

Identifiers
- Aliases: CCL27, ALP, CTACK, CTAK, ESKINE, ILC, PESKY, SCYA27, C-C motif chemokine ligand 27
- External IDs: OMIM: 604833; MGI: 1891389; GeneCards: CCL27
Available structures
PDB	Ortholog search: PDBe RCSB
PDB	List of PDB id codes 2KUM

Gene location (Human)
Chr.	Chromosome 9 (human)
Band	9p13.3	Start	34,661,880 bp
Band	9p13.3	End	34,664,048 bp

Gene location (Mouse)
Chr.	Chromosome 4 (mouse)
Band	4 A5|4	Start	42,655,251 bp
Band	4 A5|4	End	42,656,005 bp
RNA expression pattern
Bgee	Human / Mouse (ortholog); Top expressed in: skin of abdomen; skin of leg; testicle; gonad; stromal cell of endometrium; ganglionic eminence; ventricular zone; primary visual cortex; left testis; skeletal muscle tissue / Top expressed in: zone of skin; pelvic ganglion; lip; placenta; spermatocyte; urethra; female urethra; adrenal gland; male urethra; thymus; More reference expression data
BioGPS	n/a
Gene ontology
Molecular function	chemokine activity; cytokine activity; CCR3 chemokine receptor binding; protein binding
Cellular component	extracellular region; extracellular space
Biological process	chemotaxis; cell-cell signaling; immune response; cell chemotaxis; antimicrobial humoral immune response mediated by antimicrobial peptide; regulation of signaling receptor activity; G protein-coupled receptor signaling pathway; positive regulation of T cell chemotaxis; positive regulation of mononuclear cell migration; positive regulation of actin cytoskeleton reorganization
Sources:Amigo / QuickGO
Orthologs
Databases	NCBI: entry; OMA: entry
Species	Human	Mouse
Entrez	10850	100040048
Ensembl	ENSG00000213927	ENSMUSG00000096826
UniProt	Q9Y4X3	Q9Z1X0
RefSeq (mRNA)	NM_006664	NM_001199959; NM_001199960; NM_001199961
RefSeq (protein)	NP_006655	NP_001041644; NP_001157516; NP_001157517; NP_001333994; NP_001348175 NP_035466
Location (UCSC)	Chr 9: 34.66 – 34.66 Mb	Chr 4: 42.66 – 42.66 Mb
PubMed search
- Wikidata
View/Edit Human	View/Edit Mouse

chemokine (C-C motif) ligand 27

Identifiers
- Symbol: CCL27
- Alt. symbols: SCYA27, ALP, ILC, CTACK, skinkine, ESkine, PESKY, CTAK
- NCBI gene: 10850
- HGNC: 10626
- OMIM: 604833
- RefSeq: NM_006664
- UniProt: Q9Y4X3

Other data
- Locus: Chr. 9 q13
Search for
- Structures: Swiss-model
- Domains: InterPro

C-C motif chemokine ligand 27 is a protein that in humans is encoded by the CCL27 gene.

== Function ==
This gene is one of several CC cytokine genes clustered on the p-arm of chromosome 9. Cytokines are a family of secreted proteins involved in immunoregulatory and inflammatory processes. The CC cytokines are proteins characterized by two adjacent cysteines. The protein encoded by this gene is chemotactic for skin-associated memory T lymphocytes. CCL27 is associated with homing of memory T lymphocytes to the skin, and plays a role in T cell-mediated inflammation of the skin. CCL27 is expressed in numerous tissues, including gonads, thymus, placenta and skin. It elicits its chemotactic effects by binding to the chemokine receptor CCR10. The gene for CCL27 is located on human chromosome 9. Studies of a similar murine protein indicate that these protein-receptor interactions have a pivotal role in T cell-mediated skin inflammation. [provided by RefSeq, Sep 2014].
