= CCL23 =

Mammalian protein found in humans

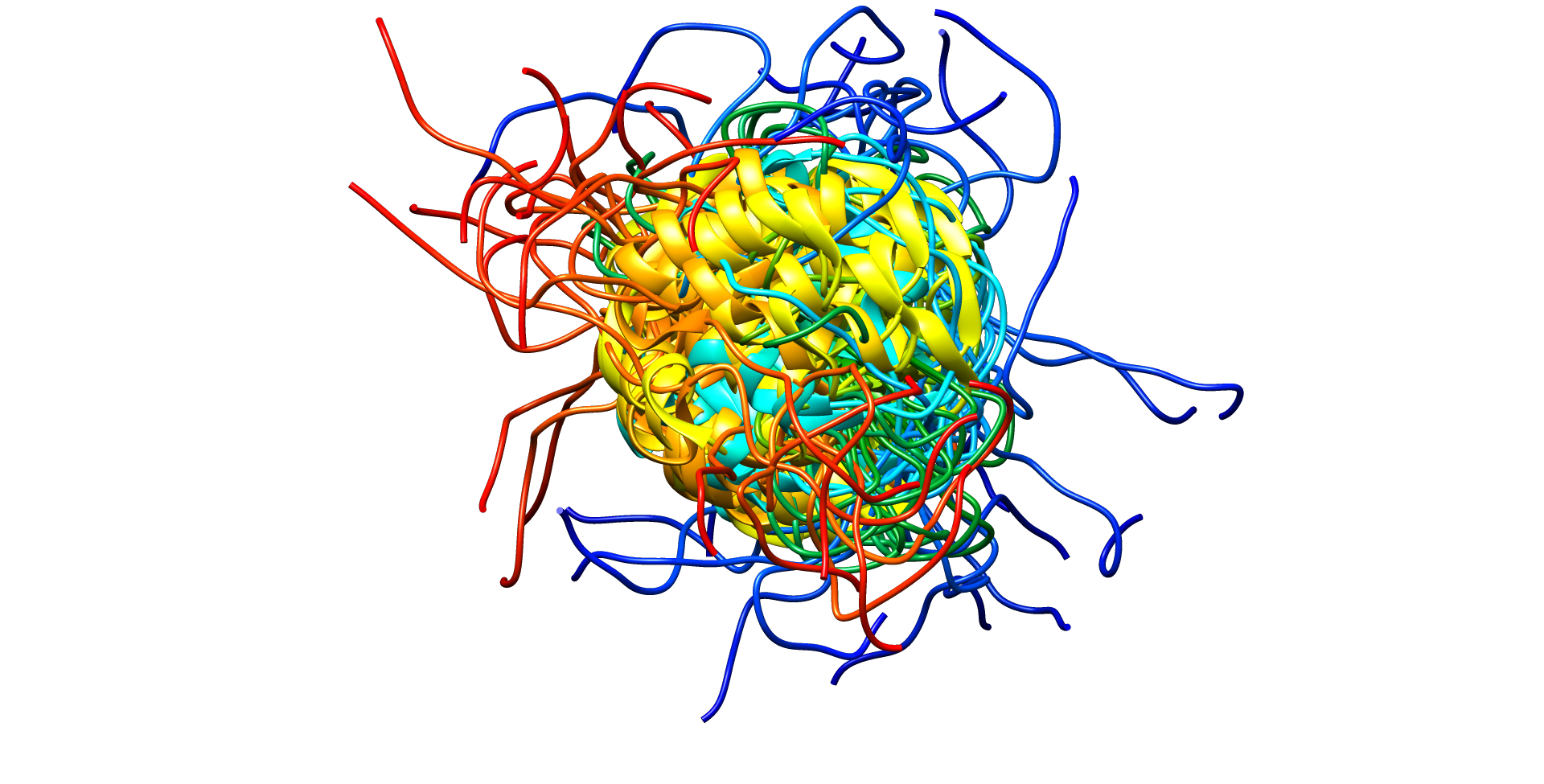

Identifiers
- Aliases: CCL23, CK-BETA-8, CKb8, Ckb-8, Ckb-8-1, MIP-3, MIP3, MPIF-1, SCYA23, hmrp-2a, C-C motif chemokine ligand 23
- External IDs: OMIM: 602494; MGI: 98263; GeneCards: CCL23
Available structures
| PDB | Ortholog search: PDBe RCSB |
| PDB | List of PDB id codes 1G91 |

Gene location (Human)
| Chr. | Chromosome 17 (human) |
| Band | 17q12 | Start | 36,013,056 bp |
| Band | 17q12 | End | 36,017,972 bp |

Gene location (Mouse)
| Chr. | Chromosome 11 (mouse) |
| Band | 11 C|11 50.85 cM | Start | 83,478,708 bp |
| Band | 11 C|11 50.85 cM | End | 83,483,913 bp |
RNA expression pattern
| Bgee | Human / Mouse (ortholog); Top expressed in: testicle; right lung; upper lobe of left lung; appendix; left uterine tube; ectocervix; spleen; rectum; canal of the cervix; gastric mucosa / Top expressed in: granulocyte; crypt of lieberkuhn of small intestine; Paneth cell; right lung lobe; stroma of bone marrow; left colon; ileum; blood; jejunum; duodenum; More reference expression data |
| BioGPS | n/a |
Gene ontology
| Molecular function | cytokine activity; heparin binding; chemokine activity; CCR1 chemokine receptor binding; CCR chemokine receptor binding |
| Cellular component | extracellular region; extracellular space |
| Biological process | G protein-coupled receptor signaling pathway; monocyte chemotaxis; chemokine-mediated signaling pathway; cell-cell signaling; cellular response to tumor necrosis factor; cellular calcium ion homeostasis; neutrophil chemotaxis; chemotaxis; negative regulation of C-C chemokine binding; positive regulation of GTPase activity; immune response; cellular response to interleukin-1; positive regulation of ERK1 and ERK2 cascade; cellular response to interferon-gamma; lymphocyte chemotaxis; signal transduction; negative regulation of cell population proliferation; inflammatory response; regulation of signaling receptor activity; eosinophil chemotaxis |
Sources:Amigo / QuickGO
Orthologs
| Databases | NCBI: entry; OMA: entry |
| Species | Human | Mouse |
| Entrez | 6368 | 20305 |
| Ensembl | ENSG00000276114; ENSG00000274736 | ENSMUSG00000018927 |
| UniProt | P55773 | P27784 |
| RefSeq (mRNA) | NM_005064; NM_145898 | NM_009139 |
| RefSeq (protein) | NP_005055; NP_665905 | NP_033165 |
| Location (UCSC) | Chr 17: 36.01 – 36.02 Mb | Chr 11: 83.48 – 83.48 Mb |
| PubMed search |
- Wikidata
| View/Edit Human | View/Edit Mouse |

Chemokine (C-C motif) ligand 23 (CCL23) is a small cytokine belonging to the CC chemokine family that is also known as Macrophage inflammatory protein 3 (MIP-3) and Myeloid progenitor inhibitory factor 1 (MPIF-1). CCL23 is predominantly expressed in lung and liver tissue, but is also found in bone marrow and placenta. It is also expressed in some cell lines of myeloid origin. CCL23 is highly chemotactic for resting T cells and monocytes and slightly chemotactic for neutrophils. It has also been attributed to an inhibitory activity on hematopoietic progenitor cells. The gene for CCL23 is located on human chromosome 17 in a locus containing several other CC chemokines. CCL23 is a ligand for the chemokine receptor CCR1.
