= C-C chemokine receptor type 6 =

Mammalian protein found in humans

CCR6

Identifiers
- Aliases: CCR6, BN-1, C-C CKR-6, CC-CKR-6, CCR-6, CD196, CKR-L3, CKRL3, CMKBR6, DCR2, DRY6, GPR29, GPRCY4, STRL22, C-C motif chemokine receptor 6
- External IDs: OMIM: 601835; MGI: 1333797; GeneCards: CCR6

Gene location (Human)
Chr.	Chromosome 6 (human)
Band	6q27	Start	167,111,807 bp
Band	6q27	End	167,139,141 bp

Gene location (Mouse)
Chr.	Chromosome 17 (mouse)
Band	17|17 A1	Start	8,454,875 bp
Band	17|17 A1	End	8,475,973 bp
RNA expression pattern
Bgee	Human / Mouse (ortholog); Top expressed in: lymph node; appendix; spleen; testicle; granulocyte; blood; duodenum; gallbladder; rectum; tonsil / Top expressed in: spleen; lymph node; mesenteric lymph nodes; blood; subcutaneous adipose tissue; spermatid; embryo; embryo; thymus; blastocyst; More reference expression data
BioGPS	n/a
Gene ontology
Molecular function	G protein-coupled receptor activity; signal transducer activity; chemokine receptor activity; protein binding; C-C chemokine receptor activity; C-C chemokine binding; signaling receptor activity; chemokine binding
Cellular component	integral component of membrane; membrane; plasma membrane; integral component of plasma membrane; intracellular anatomical structure; cell surface; sperm midpiece; sperm flagellum; sperm principal piece; sperm plasma membrane; external side of plasma membrane
Biological process	positive regulation of cytosolic calcium ion concentration; positive regulation of epithelial cell migration; dendritic cell chemotaxis; cellular defense response; humoral immune response; immune response; positive regulation of dendritic cell chemotaxis; signal transduction; calcium-mediated signaling; chemotaxis; cell chemotaxis; chemokine-mediated signaling pathway; leukocyte migration involved in inflammatory response; isotype switching to IgA isotypes; positive regulation of flagellated sperm motility involved in capacitation; lymphocyte migration; T cell migration; thymocyte migration; DN2 thymocyte differentiation; DN3 thymocyte differentiation; regulation of T cell migration; G protein-coupled receptor signaling pathway
Sources:Amigo / QuickGO
Orthologs
Databases	NCBI: entry; OMA: entry
Species	Human	Mouse
Entrez	1235	12458
Ensembl	ENSG00000112486	ENSMUSG00000040899
UniProt	P51684	O54689
RefSeq (mRNA)	NM_031409; NM_004367; NM_001394582	NM_001190333; NM_001190334; NM_001190335; NM_001190336; NM_001190337 NM_001190338; NM_009835
RefSeq (protein)	NP_004358; NP_113597	NP_001177262; NP_001177263; NP_001177264; NP_001177265; NP_001177266 NP_001177267; NP_033965
Location (UCSC)	Chr 6: 167.11 – 167.14 Mb	Chr 17: 8.45 – 8.48 Mb
PubMed search
- Wikidata
View/Edit Human	View/Edit Mouse

Chemokine receptor 6 also known as CCR6 is a CC chemokine receptor protein which in humans is encoded by the CCR6 gene. CCR6 has also recently been designated CD196 (cluster of differentiation 196). The gene is located on the long arm of Chromosome 6 (6q27) on the Watson (plus) strand. It is 139,737 bases long and encodes a protein of 374 amino acids (molecular weight 42,494 Da).

== Function ==
This protein belongs to family A of G protein-coupled receptor superfamily. The gene is expressed in lymphatic and non-lymphatic tissue as spleen, lymph nodes, pancreas, colon, appendix, small intestine. CCR6 is expressed on B-cells, immature dendritic cells (DC), T-cells (Th1, Th2, Th17, Treg), natural killer T cells (NKT cells) and neutrophils. The ligand of this receptor is CCL20 or in the other name - macrophage inflammatory protein 3 alpha (MIP-3 alpha). This chemokine receptor is special because it binds only one chemokine ligand CCL20 in comparison to other chemokine receptors. CCR6 has a key role between immature DC and adaptive immunity. This receptor has been shown to be important for B-lineage maturation and antigen-driven B-cell differentiation, and it may regulate the migration and recruitment of dendritic cells and T cells during inflammatory and immunological responses. Alternatively spliced transcript variants that encode the same protein have been described for this gene.

Interleukin 4 (IL-4) and interferon gamma (IFNγ) suppress expression of CCR6 in langerhans cells development and interleukin 10 (IL-10) induces the expression. It can regulate immune response in inflammatory tissue.

Proinflammatory Th17 cells express CCR6 and its ligand CCL20. CCR6 influences their migration to sites of inflammation. Some Th17 cells migrate via chemokine gradient of CCL20 to inflammatory sites and themselves can express more CCL20 to bring in more Th17 cells and regulatory T-cells (Treg). This can lead to chronic inflammation. In some models, the lack of CCR6 leads to less severe autoimmune encephalomyelitis.

== Clinical significance ==
CCR6 has a function in development and metastatic spread of gastrointestinal malignancies. Expression of CCR6 was found to be up-regulated in colorectal cancer. Many patients with colorectal cancer have liver metastases. Colorectal carcinoma cells express CCR6 and CCL20. High level of CCL20 in liver chemoattract colorectal carcinoma cells and cause metastases in liver. Novel research has identified a microRNA that is able to downregulate CCR6 in cancer cell lines.

CCR6 has been associated with Crohn's disease.
