= C-C motif chemokine ligand 24 =

Protein-coding gene in humans

CCL24

Identifiers
- Aliases: CCL24, Ckb-6, MPIF-2, MPIF2, SCYA24, C-C motif chemokine ligand 24
- External IDs: OMIM: 602495; MGI: 1928953; GeneCards: CCL24
Available structures
PDB	Ortholog search: PDBe RCSB
PDB	List of PDB id codes 1EIG, 1EIH

Gene location (Human)
Chr.	Chromosome 7 (human)
Band	7q11.23	Start	75,810,825 bp
Band	7q11.23	End	75,823,356 bp

Gene location (Mouse)
Chr.	Chromosome 5 (mouse)
Band	5|5 G2	Start	135,598,791 bp
Band	5|5 G2	End	135,601,903 bp
RNA expression pattern
Bgee	Human / Mouse (ortholog); Top expressed in: rectum; spleen; mucosa of transverse colon; appendix; duodenum; lymph node; jejunal mucosa; right coronary artery; mucosa of sigmoid colon; upper lobe of left lung / Top expressed in: muscle of thigh; lip; white adipose tissue; esophagus; skeletal muscle tissue; jejunum; migratory enteric neural crest cell; subcutaneous adipose tissue; dermis; stomach; More reference expression data
BioGPS	n/a
Gene ontology
Molecular function	cytokine activity; chemokine activity; CCR3 chemokine receptor binding; receptor ligand activity; protein binding; CCR chemokine receptor binding
Cellular component	extracellular region; extracellular space
Biological process	eosinophil chemotaxis; monocyte chemotaxis; neutrophil chemotaxis; positive regulation of endothelial cell proliferation; positive regulation of ERK1 and ERK2 cascade; positive regulation of GTPase activity; positive regulation of angiogenesis; G protein-coupled receptor signaling pathway; cell-cell signaling; positive regulation of eosinophil migration; chemotaxis; cytoskeleton organization; lymphocyte chemotaxis; positive regulation of cell migration; cellular response to tumor necrosis factor; chemokine-mediated signaling pathway; cellular response to interleukin-1; cellular response to interferon-gamma; positive regulation of actin filament polymerization; signal transduction; regulation of cell shape; immune response; inflammatory response; positive regulation of inflammatory response; regulation of signaling receptor activity
Sources:Amigo / QuickGO
Orthologs
Databases	NCBI: entry; OMA: entry
Species	Human	Mouse
Entrez	6369	56221
Ensembl	ENSG00000106178	ENSMUSG00000004814
UniProt	O00175	Q9JKC0
RefSeq (mRNA)	NM_002991; NM_001371193	NM_019577; NM_001356630
RefSeq (protein)	NP_002982; NP_001358122	NP_062523; NP_001343559
Location (UCSC)	Chr 7: 75.81 – 75.82 Mb	Chr 5: 135.6 – 135.6 Mb
PubMed search
- Wikidata
View/Edit Human	View/Edit Mouse

chemokine (C-C motif) ligand 24

Identifiers
- Symbol: CCL24
- Alt. symbols: SCYA24, Ckb-6, MPIF-2, eotaxin-2
- NCBI gene: 6369
- HGNC: 10623
- OMIM: 602495
- PDB: 1EIG
- RefSeq: NM_002991
- UniProt: O00175

Other data
- Locus: Chr. 7 q11.23
Search for
- Structures: Swiss-model
- Domains: InterPro

C-C motif chemokine ligand 24 is a protein that in humans is encoded by the CCL24 gene. CCL24 is also known as myeloid progenitor inhibitory factor 2 (MPIF-2) or eosinophil chemotactic protein 2 (eotaxin-2).

== Function ==
CCL24 belongs to the subfamily of small cytokine CC genes. Cytokines are a family of secreted proteins involved in immunoregulatory and inflammatory processes. The CC cytokines are proteins characterized by two adjacent cysteines. CCL24 interacts with chemokine receptor CCR3 to induce chemotaxis in eosinophils. The cytokine encoded by this gene displays chemotactic activity on resting T lymphocytes, a minimal activity on neutrophils, and is negative on monocytes and activated T lymphocytes. The protein is also a strong suppressor of colony formation by a multipotential hematopoietic progenitor cell line.

== Clinical significance ==
Elevated levels of eotaxin-2 has been seen in patients with aspirin-exacerbated respiratory disease (AERD), such as asthma. People with lower plasma levels of eotaxin-2 have not been showing tendency to develop aspirin inducible asthma.
