= Peripheral blood lymphocyte =

Type of white blood cell

Peripheral blood lymphocytes (PBLs) are mature lymphocytes that circulate in the blood, rather than localizing to organs (such as the spleen or lymph nodes). They comprise T cells, NK cells and B cells.
