= CCL11 =

Mammalian protein found in humans

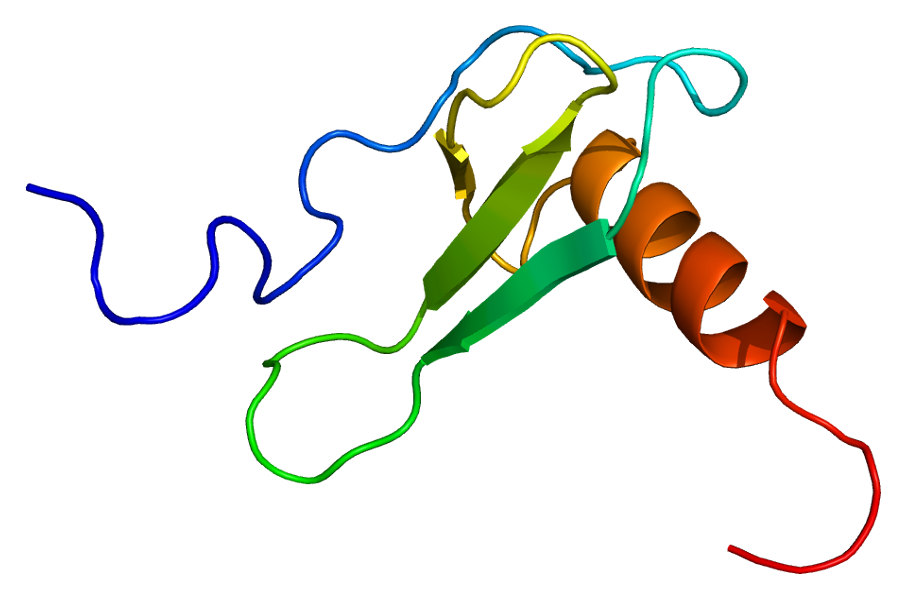

Identifiers
- Aliases: CCL11, SCYA11, C-C motif chemokine ligand 11
- External IDs: OMIM: 601156; MGI: 103576; GeneCards: CCL11
Available structures
PDB	Ortholog search: PDBe RCSB
PDB	List of PDB id codes 1EOT, 2EOT, 2MPM

Gene location (Human)
Chr.	Chromosome 17 (human)
Band	17q12	Start	34,285,742 bp
Band	17q12	End	34,288,334 bp

Gene location (Mouse)
Chr.	Chromosome 11 (mouse)
Band	11 C|11 49.84 cM	Start	81,948,649 bp
Band	11 C|11 49.84 cM	End	81,953,781 bp
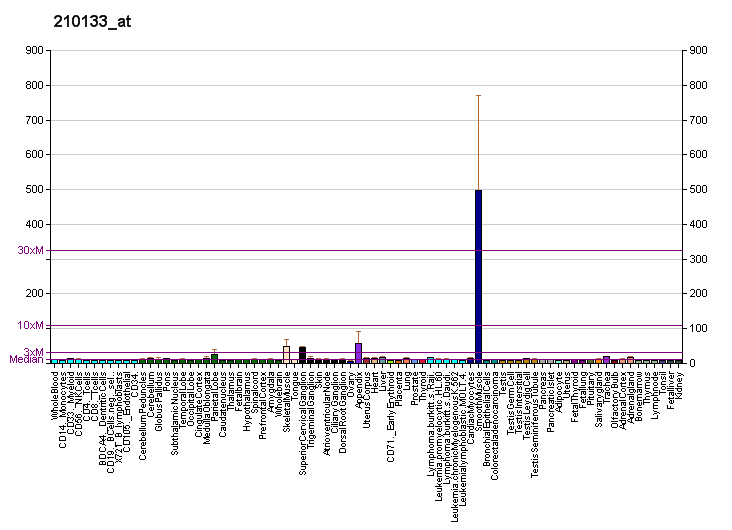
RNA expression pattern
Bgee	Human / Mouse (ortholog); Top expressed in: pylorus; cardia; cecum; appendix; epithelium of colon; muscle layer of sigmoid colon; right ventricle; fundus; duodenum; mucosa of transverse colon / Top expressed in: cervix; lumbar spinal ganglion; intercostal muscle; migratory enteric neural crest cell; sciatic nerve; white adipose tissue; muscle of thigh; tunica adventitia of aorta; lip; medial head of gastrocnemius muscle; More reference expression data
BioGPS	More reference expression data
Gene ontology
Molecular function	cytokine activity; protein binding; chemokine activity; CCR3 chemokine receptor binding; protein dimerization activity; receptor ligand activity; CCR chemokine receptor binding
Cellular component	extracellular region; extracellular space; intracellular anatomical structure
Biological process	G protein-coupled receptor signaling pathway; positive regulation of endothelial cell proliferation; positive regulation of actin filament polymerization; response to interleukin-4; branching involved in mammary gland duct morphogenesis; monocyte chemotaxis; actin filament organization; positive regulation of cell migration; chemokine-mediated signaling pathway; response to interleukin-13; cellular response to tumor necrosis factor; response to virus; cellular calcium ion homeostasis; mast cell chemotaxis; neutrophil chemotaxis; positive regulation of angiogenesis; mammary duct terminal end bud growth; chemotaxis; protein phosphorylation; positive regulation of GTPase activity; cell adhesion; cytoskeleton organization; cellular response to interleukin-1; immune response; positive regulation of ERK1 and ERK2 cascade; regulation of cell shape; cellular response to interferon-gamma; lymphocyte chemotaxis; response to radiation; inflammatory response; chronic inflammatory response; signal transduction; eosinophil chemotaxis; antimicrobial humoral immune response mediated by antimicrobial peptide; regulation of signaling receptor activity; cytokine-mediated signaling pathway; ERK1 and ERK2 cascade
Sources:Amigo / QuickGO
Orthologs
Databases	NCBI: entry; OMA: entry
Species	Human	Mouse
Entrez	6356	20292
Ensembl	ENSG00000172156	ENSMUSG00000020676
UniProt	P51671	P48298
RefSeq (mRNA)	NM_002986	NM_011330
RefSeq (protein)	NP_002977	NP_035460
Location (UCSC)	Chr 17: 34.29 – 34.29 Mb	Chr 11: 81.95 – 81.95 Mb
PubMed search
- Wikidata
View/Edit Human	View/Edit Mouse

C-C motif chemokine 11 also known as eosinophil chemotactic protein and eotaxin-1 is a protein that in humans is encoded by the CCL11 gene. This gene is encoded on three exons and is located on chromosome 17.

== Function ==
CCL11 is a small cytokine belonging to the CC chemokine family. CCL11 selectively recruits eosinophils by inducing their chemotaxis, and therefore, is implicated in allergic responses. The effects of CCL11 are mediated by its binding to a G-protein-linked receptor known as a chemokine receptor. Chemokine receptors for which CCL11 is a ligand include CCR2, CCR3 and CCR5. However, it has been found that eotaxin-1 (CCL11) has high degree selectivity for its receptor, such that they are inactive on neutrophils and monocytes, which do not express CCR3.

== Clinical significance ==
Increased CCL11 levels in blood plasma are associated with aging in mice and humans. Additionally, it has been demonstrated that exposing young mice to CCL11 or the blood plasma of older mice decreases their neurogenesis and cognitive performance on behavioural tasks thought to be dependent on neurogenesis in the hippocampus.

Higher plasma concentrations of CCL11 have been found in current cannabis users compared to past users and those who had never used. CCL11 has also been found in higher concentrations in people with schizophrenia; cannabis is a known trigger of schizophrenia.

It's also a biomarker for CTE or punch-drunk syndrome.

During periods of bone inflammation, CCL11 and CCR3 are upregulated. This is associated with an increase in osteoclast activity.

In 2022, Monje et al demonstrated that elevated levels of CCL11 may contribute to the brain fog associated with both chemotherapy and so-called long covid
