= CCL20 =

Mammalian protein found in humans

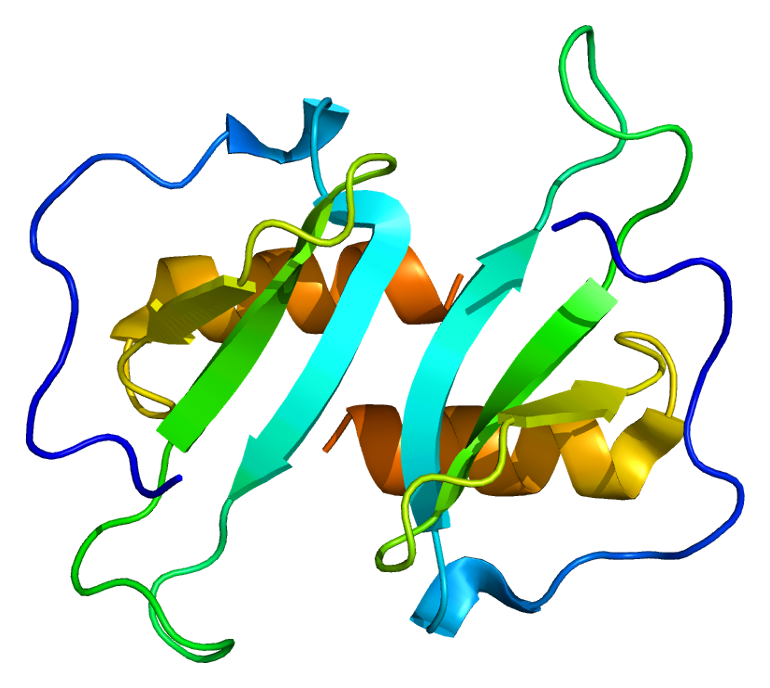

Identifiers
- Aliases: CCL20, CKb4, Exodus, LARC, MIP-3-alpha, MIP-3a, MIP3A, SCYA20, ST38, chemokine (C-C motif) ligand 20, C-C motif chemokine ligand 20
- External IDs: OMIM: 601960; MGI: 1329031; GeneCards: CCL20
Available structures
PDB	Ortholog search: PDBe RCSB
PDB	List of PDB id codes 2JYO, 1M8A, 2HCI

Gene location (Human)
Chr.	Chromosome 2 (human)
Band	2q36.3	Start	227,805,739 bp
Band	2q36.3	End	227,817,564 bp

Gene location (Mouse)
Chr.	Chromosome 1 (mouse)
Band	1 C5|1 42.69 cM	Start	83,094,487 bp
Band	1 C5|1 42.69 cM	End	83,096,888 bp
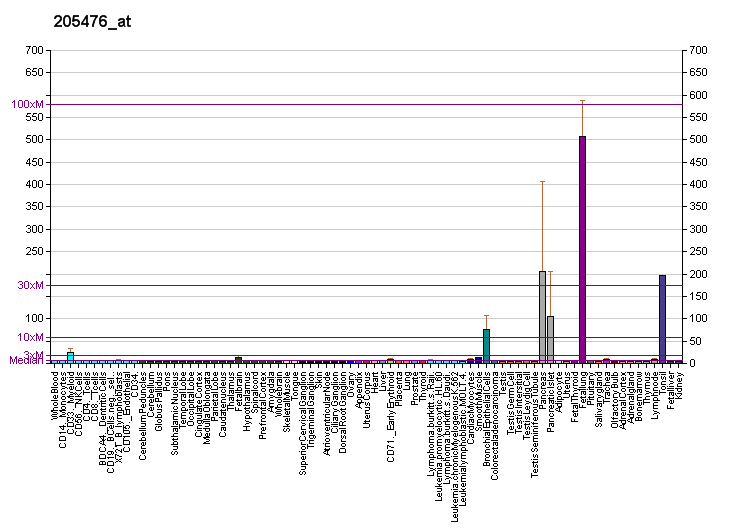
RNA expression pattern
Bgee	Human / Mouse (ortholog); Top expressed in: epithelium of nasopharynx; cartilage tissue; gallbladder; secondary oocyte; appendix; rectum; beta cell; mucosa of sigmoid colon; sperm; testicle / Top expressed in: embryo; duodenum; embryo; thymus; jejunum; colon; trachea; ileum; lip; left colon; More reference expression data
BioGPS	More reference expression data
Gene ontology
Molecular function	cytokine activity; protein binding; CCR6 chemokine receptor binding; chemokine activity; CCR chemokine receptor binding
Cellular component	extracellular region; intracellular anatomical structure; extracellular space
Biological process	monocyte chemotaxis; positive regulation of T cell migration; neutrophil chemotaxis; positive regulation of ERK1 and ERK2 cascade; positive regulation of GTPase activity; positive regulation of nitric-oxide synthase biosynthetic process; defense response to bacterium; cell-cell signaling; lymphocyte chemotaxis; wound healing; cellular response to lipoteichoic acid; cellular response to tumor necrosis factor; cellular response to organic substance; chemokine-mediated signaling pathway; cellular response to interleukin-1; cellular response to interferon-gamma; signal transduction; immune response; cellular response to lipopolysaccharide; chemotaxis; calcium-mediated signaling using intracellular calcium source; cell chemotaxis; T cell migration; thymocyte migration; inflammatory response; antimicrobial humoral immune response mediated by antimicrobial peptide; regulation of signaling receptor activity; G protein-coupled receptor signaling pathway; cytokine-mediated signaling pathway
Sources:Amigo / QuickGO
Orthologs
Databases	NCBI: entry; OMA: entry
Species	Human	Mouse
Entrez	6364	20297
Ensembl	ENSG00000115009	ENSMUSG00000026166
UniProt	P78556	O89093
RefSeq (mRNA)	NM_004591; NM_001130046	NM_001159738; NM_016960
RefSeq (protein)	NP_001123518; NP_004582	NP_001153210; NP_058656
Location (UCSC)	Chr 2: 227.81 – 227.82 Mb	Chr 1: 83.09 – 83.1 Mb
PubMed search
- Wikidata
View/Edit Human	View/Edit Mouse

Chemokine (C-C motif) ligand 20 (CCL20) or liver activation regulated chemokine (LARC) or Macrophage Inflammatory Protein-3 (MIP3A) is a small cytokine belonging to the CC chemokine family. It is strongly chemotactic for lymphocytes and weakly attracts neutrophils. CCL20 is implicated in the formation and function of mucosal lymphoid tissues via chemoattraction of lymphocytes and dendritic cells towards the epithelial cells surrounding these tissues. CCL20 elicits its effects on its target cells by binding and activating the chemokine receptor CCR6.

Gene expression of CCL20 can be induced by microbial factors such as lipopolysaccharide (LPS), and inflammatory cytokines such as tumor necrosis factor and interferon-γ, and down-regulated by IL-10. CCL20 is expressed in several tissues with highest expression observed in peripheral blood lymphocytes, lymph nodes, liver, appendix, and fetal lung and lower levels in thymus, testis, prostate and gut. The gene for CCL20 (scya20) is located on chromosome 2 in humans.

Recent research in an animal model of multiple sclerosis known as experimental autoimmune encephalitis (EAE) demonstrated that regional neural activation can create "gates" for pathogenic CD4+ T cells to enter the CNS by increasing CCL20 expression, especially at L5. Sensory nerve stimulation, elicited by using muscles in the leg or electrical stimulation as in Arima et al., 2012, activates sympathetic neurons whose axons run through the dorsal root ganglia containing cell bodies of the stimulated afferent sensory nerve. Sympathetic neuronal activity activates IL-6 amplifier resulting in increased regional CCL20 expression and subsequent pathogenic CD4+ T cell accumulation at the same spinal cord level. CCL20 expression was observed to be dependent on IL-6 amplifier activation, which is dependent on NF-κB and STAT3 activation. This research provides evidence for a critical role for CCL20 in autoimmune pathogenesis of the central nervous system.
