= CCL26 =

Mammalian protein found in humans

Identifiers
- Aliases: CCL26, IMAC, MIP-4a, MIP-4alpha, SCYA26, TSC-1, C-C motif chemokine ligand 26
- External IDs: OMIM: 604697; MGI: 3589281; GeneCards: CCL26
Available structures
PDB	Ortholog search: PDBe RCSB
PDB	List of PDB id codes 1G2S, 1G2T

Gene location (Human)
Chr.	Chromosome 7 (human)
Band	7q11.23	Start	75,769,533 bp
Band	7q11.23	End	75,789,896 bp

Gene location (Mouse)
Chr.	Chromosome 5 (mouse)
Band	5|5 G2	Start	135,589,302 bp
Band	5|5 G2	End	135,592,423 bp
RNA expression pattern
Bgee	Human / Mouse (ortholog); Top expressed in: testicle; right ovary; left ovary; tibial nerve; anterior pituitary; gonad; left uterine tube; right adrenal gland; ectocervix; left adrenal gland / Top expressed in: spermatid; testicle; jejunum; lens; colon; torso; heart; More reference expression data
BioGPS	n/a
Gene ontology
Molecular function	cytokine activity; chemokine activity; CCR3 chemokine receptor binding; receptor ligand activity; protein binding; CCR chemokine receptor binding
Cellular component	extracellular region; extracellular space
Biological process	G protein-coupled receptor signaling pathway; positive regulation of endothelial cell proliferation; positive regulation of actin filament polymerization; positive regulation of cell migration; cellular response to tumor necrosis factor; cell-cell signaling; neutrophil chemotaxis; chemotaxis; positive regulation of GTPase activity; cellular response to interleukin-1; positive regulation of ERK1 and ERK2 cascade; cellular response to interferon-gamma; signal transduction; immune response; inflammatory response; monocyte chemotaxis; T cell chemotaxis; positive regulation of chemotaxis; chemokine-mediated signaling pathway; regulation of signaling receptor activity; eosinophil chemotaxis; lymphocyte chemotaxis
Sources:Amigo / QuickGO
Orthologs
Databases	NCBI: entry; OMA: entry
Species	Human	Mouse
Entrez	10344	541307
Ensembl	ENSG00000006606	ENSMUSG00000070464
UniProt	Q9Y258	F8VQM2
RefSeq (mRNA)	NM_006072; NM_001371936; NM_001371938	NM_001013412
RefSeq (protein)	NP_006063; NP_001358865; NP_001358867	NP_001013430
Location (UCSC)	Chr 7: 75.77 – 75.79 Mb	Chr 5: 135.59 – 135.59 Mb
PubMed search
- Wikidata
View/Edit Human	View/Edit Mouse

Chemokine (C-C motif) ligand 26 (CCL26) is a small cytokine belonging to the CC chemokine family that is also called Eotaxin-3, Macrophage inflammatory protein 4-alpha (MIP-4-alpha), Thymic stroma chemokine-1 (TSC-1), and IMAC. It is expressed by several tissues including heart, lung and ovary, and in endothelial cells that have been stimulated with the cytokine interleukin 4. CCL26 is chemotactic for eosinophils and basophils and elicits its effects by binding to the cell surface chemokine receptor CCR3. This gene for chemokine is located on human chromosome 7.
