= CCL4 =

Mammalian protein found in humans

CCL4L1

Identifiers
- Aliases: CCL4L1, AT744.2, CCL4L, LAG-1, LAG1, SCYA4L, SCYA4L1, MIP-1-beta, SCYA4L2, C-C motif chemokine ligand 4 like 1
- External IDs: OMIM: 603782; GeneCards: CCL4L1
Gene ontology
Molecular function	chemokine activity; cytokine activity; protein binding; CCR chemokine receptor binding
Cellular component	extracellular region; extracellular space
Biological process	lymphocyte chemotaxis; chemokine-mediated signaling pathway; cellular response to tumor necrosis factor; G protein-coupled receptor signaling pathway; positive regulation of GTPase activity; chemotaxis; inflammatory response; cellular response to interleukin-1; monocyte chemotaxis; neutrophil chemotaxis; immune response; positive regulation of ERK1 and ERK2 cascade; cellular response to interferon-gamma; regulation of signaling receptor activity; eosinophil chemotaxis
Sources:Amigo / QuickGO
Orthologs
Databases	NCBI: entry
Species	Human	Mouse
Entrez	388372	n/a
Ensembl	n/a	n/a
UniProt	Q8NHW4	n/a
RefSeq (mRNA)	NM_207007	n/a
RefSeq (protein)	NP_996890	n/a
Location (UCSC)	n/a	n/a
PubMed search		n/a
- Wikidata
View/Edit Human

Chemokine (C-C motif) ligands 4 (also CCL4), previously known as macrophage inflammatory protein (MIP-1β), is a protein which in humans is encoded by the CCL4 gene. CCL4 belongs to a cluster of genes located on 17q11-q21 of the chromosomal region. Identification and localization of the gene on the chromosome 17 was in 1990 although the discovery of MIP-1 was initiated in 1988 with the purification of a protein doublet corresponding to inflammatory activity from supernatant of endotoxin-stimulated murine macrophages. At that time, it was also named as "macrophage inflammatory protein-1" (MIP-1) due to its inflammatory properties.

CCL4 is a small cytokine that belongs to the CC chemokine subfamily. CCL4 is being secreted under mitogenic signals and antigens and hereby acts as a chemoattractant for natural killer cells, monocytes and various other immune cells in the site of inflamed or damaged tissue.

== Genomics ==
In the human genome, CCL4 and many other CC chemokines is encoded by a single gene on chromosome 17 (17q11-q21). The CCL4 gene consists of three exons and two introns which are separated by 14 kb and are organized in a head to head fashion. MIP-1 genes have 3 untranslated gene regions containing a polyadenylation site (AATAAA) and several AT-rich sequences. The CCL4 protein precursor consist of 92 amino acids. In turn, the mature CCL4 protein is 69 amino acids long. The CCL4 predicted Mr weight is 7814.8 Da with no apparent N-linked glycosylation site as in other of the MIP-1 proteins.

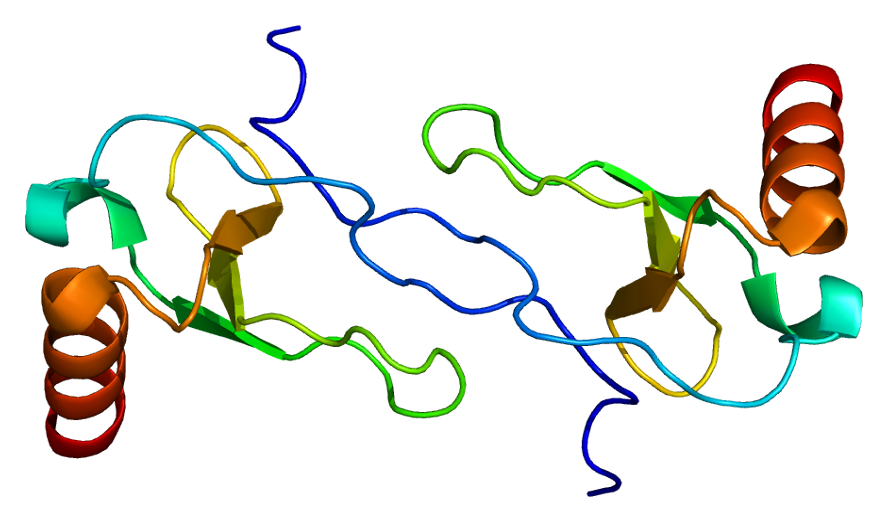
Structure of the CCL4 protein.

== Molecular structure ==
CCL4 is a polypeptide chain with a molecular weight of approximately 8-10 kDa arranged in a three-dimensional structure in the form of as symmetrical homodimer.

Monomeric subunits in their secondary structure composed by a triple-stranded antiparallel sheet form in a Greek key structure on top of which lies an α-helix. NH2-terminus is arranged as a long loop followed by a four-residue helical turn. The overall form of homodimer is globular elongated and cylindrical with sizes: 56 Å × 30 Å × 26 Å in contrast of monomer structure which is similar to IL-8.

CCL4 as well as other MIP-1s whether human or mouse have a high tendency to self-aggregation. Aggregation as a reversible and dynamic process depends largely on the concentration of chemokine.

The distinction between the CC chemokine families, MIP-1α and MIP-1β, was initially based on whether the first two cysteine residues are separated by one residue (α) or are adjacent (β). Final form of tertiary structure of MIP-1 has been defined by heteronuclear magnetic resonance (NMR) analysis.

Concentration of this chemokine has been shown to be inversely related with MicroRNA-125b. Concentration of CCL4 within the body increases with age, which may cause chronic inflammation and liver damage.

== Function ==
CCL4 as a chemokine which is produced during inflammation, damage or other important dynamic processes as an angiogenesis to attract immune cells as leukocytes transgress the vascular endothelium and migrate into peripheral tissues.

Production of CCL4

CCL4 is produced by: monocytes, B cells, T cells, NK cells, dendritic cells, neutrophils, fibroblasts, endothelial cells such as vascular smooth muscle cells, brain microvessel endothelial cells, fetal microglia and epithelial cells.

- Monocytes produce high amounts of CCL4 when they are stimulated with LPS or IL-7 and production is suppressed by IL-4.
- T cells and B cells secrete CCL4 response to Ag receptor (BCR) triggering.
- NK cells produce CCL4 in response to stimulation with IL-2, physiological activation signals such as lysis. NK cells can be important source of CC chemokines and may suppress HIV infection by inhibition replication of HIV-1 virus by interfering with the ability to utilize CCR5 as a coreceptor for entry in CD4(+) cells.
- Dendritic cells secrete and respond to chemokines after stimulation to LPS, TNFα, or CD40 ligand. In maturing of DC production of chemokines have different impact on chemokine receptor function: CCR1 and CCR5 were down-regulated whereas CCR7 were stimulated increased in maturing DC. Production of chemokines provides DC with the capacity to self-regulate their migratory behavior as well as to recruit other cells.
- Neutrophils produce CCL4 in the presence of IFN-gamma and its inhibition by IL-10.
- Endothelial cells release CCL4 following stimulation with LPS, TNFα, IFN-, or IL-1.

CCL4 is a major HIV-suppressive factor produced by CD8+ T cells.

Perforin-low memory CD8+ T cells that normally synthesize MIP-1-beta.

CCL4 is produced by: neutrophils, monocytes, B cells, T cells, fibroblasts, endothelial cells, and epithelial cells.

== Interactions ==
CCL4 has been shown to interact with CCL3.

CCL4 binds to G protein-Coupled Receptors CCR5 and CCR8.

== See also ==
- Macrophage inflammatory protein
