= CCL3 =

Mammalian protein found in humans

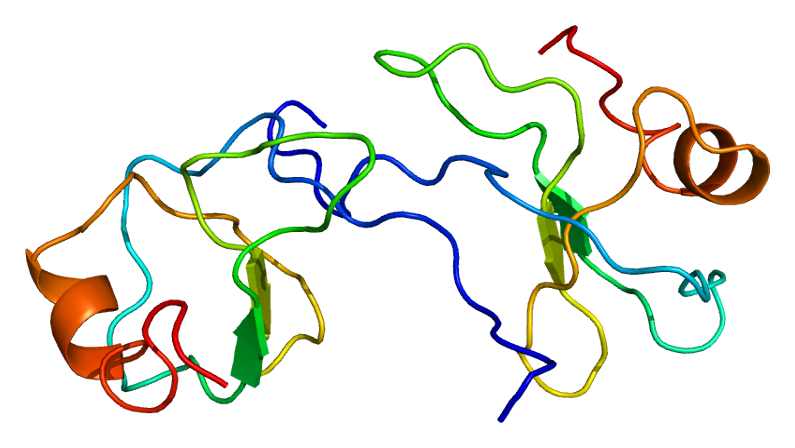

Identifiers
- Aliases: CCL3, G0S19-1, LD78ALPHA, MIP-1-alpha, MIP1A, SCYA3, C-C motif chemokine ligand 3
- External IDs: OMIM: 182283; MGI: 98260; GeneCards: CCL3
Available structures
PDB	Ortholog search: PDBe RCSB
PDB	List of PDB id codes 1B50, 1B53, 2X69, 2X6G, 3FPU, 3H44, 3KBX, 4RA8, 4ZKB, 5D65, 5COR

Gene location (Human)
Chr.	Chromosome 17 (human)
Band	17q12	Start	36,088,256 bp
Band	17q12	End	36,090,169 bp

Gene location (Mouse)
Chr.	Chromosome 11 (mouse)
Band	11 C|11 51.04 cM	Start	83,538,670 bp
Band	11 C|11 51.04 cM	End	83,540,181 bp
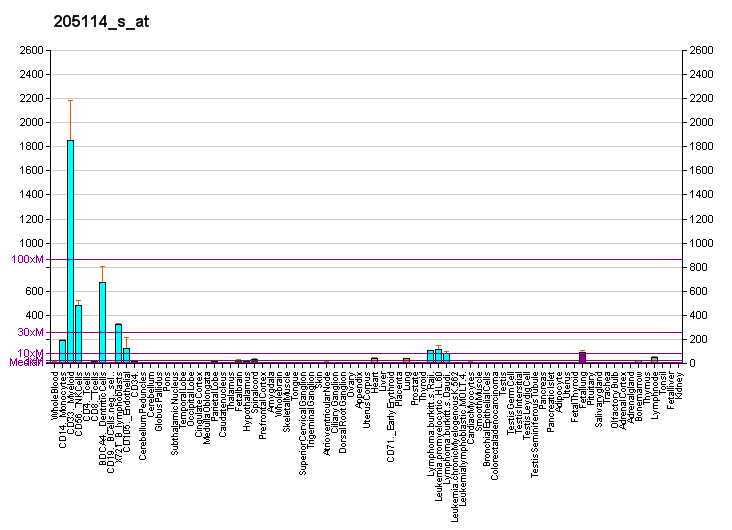
RNA expression pattern
Bgee	Human / Mouse (ortholog); Top expressed in: bone marrow; granulocyte; spleen; monocyte; bone marrow cell; gallbladder; placenta; testicle; lymph node; appendix / Top expressed in: granulocyte; stroma of bone marrow; calvaria; spermatid; blood; dermis; secondary oocyte; thymus; islet of Langerhans; right kidney; More reference expression data
BioGPS	More reference expression data
Gene ontology
Molecular function	protein kinase activity; cytokine activity; CCR5 chemokine receptor binding; chemokine activity; CCR1 chemokine receptor binding; kinase activity; phospholipase activator activity; calcium-dependent protein kinase C activity; protein binding; identical protein binding; chemoattractant activity; CCR chemokine receptor binding
Cellular component	cytoplasm; cytosol; intracellular anatomical structure; extracellular region; extracellular space
Biological process	G protein-coupled receptor signaling pathway; signaling; negative regulation of bone mineralization; positive regulation of protein kinase B signaling; release of sequestered calcium ion into cytosol by sarcoplasmic reticulum; response to cholesterol; positive regulation of calcium-mediated signaling; regulation of sensory perception of pain; protein kinase B signaling; monocyte chemotaxis; negative regulation of osteoclast differentiation; astrocyte cell migration; positive regulation of cell migration; positive regulation of natural killer cell chemotaxis; chemokine-mediated signaling pathway; T cell chemotaxis; cell-cell signaling; cellular response to tumor necrosis factor; eosinophil chemotaxis; cellular response to organic cyclic compound; cellular calcium ion homeostasis; negative regulation of gene expression; neutrophil chemotaxis; cell activation; MAPK cascade; chemotaxis; positive regulation of GTPase activity; positive regulation of neuron apoptotic process; positive regulation of calcium ion import; macrophage chemotaxis; positive regulation of gene expression; cytoskeleton organization; osteoblast differentiation; cellular response to interleukin-1; immune response; positive regulation of ERK1 and ERK2 cascade; regulation of cell shape; positive regulation of tumor necrosis factor production; cellular response to interferon-gamma; lymphocyte chemotaxis; inflammatory response; granulocyte chemotaxis; response to toxic substance; eosinophil degranulation; lipopolysaccharide-mediated signaling pathway; calcium ion transport; calcium-mediated signaling; exocytosis; positive regulation of calcium ion transport; positive chemotaxis; positive regulation of inflammatory response; regulation of signaling receptor activity; cytokine-mediated signaling pathway; regulation of behavior; positive regulation of microglial cell activation; positive regulation of microglial cell migration
Sources:Amigo / QuickGO
Orthologs
Databases	NCBI: entry; OMA: entry
Species	Human	Mouse
Entrez	6348	20302
Ensembl	ENSG00000278567; ENSG00000277632; ENSG00000274221	ENSMUSG00000000982
UniProt	P10147	P10855
RefSeq (mRNA)	NM_002983	NM_011337
RefSeq (protein)	NP_002974	NP_035467
Location (UCSC)	Chr 17: 36.09 – 36.09 Mb	Chr 11: 83.54 – 83.54 Mb
PubMed search
- Wikidata
View/Edit Human	View/Edit Mouse

Chemokine (C-C motif) ligand 3 (CCL3) also known as macrophage inflammatory protein 1-alpha (MIP-1-alpha) is a protein that in humans is encoded by the CCL3 gene.

== Function ==
CCL3 is a cytokine belonging to the CC chemokine family that is involved in the acute inflammatory state in the recruitment and activation of polymorphonuclear leukocytes through binding to the receptors CCR1, CCR4 and CCR5.

Sherry et al. (1988) demonstrated 2 protein components of MIP1, called by them alpha (CCL3, this protein) and beta (CCL4).

CCL3 produces a monophasic fever of rapid onset whose magnitude is equal to or greater than that of fevers produced with either recombinant human tumor necrosis factor or recombinant human interleukin-1. However, in contrast to these two endogenous pyrogens, the fever induced by MIP-1 is not inhibited by the cyclooxygenase inhibitor ibuprofen and CCL3 may participate in the febrile response that is not mediated through prostaglandin synthesis and clinically cannot be ablated by cyclooxygenase.

== Interactions ==
CCL3 has been shown to interact with CCL4. Attracts macrophages, monocytes and neutrophils.

== See also ==
- Macrophage inflammatory proteins
