= CCL7 =

Mammalian protein found in humans

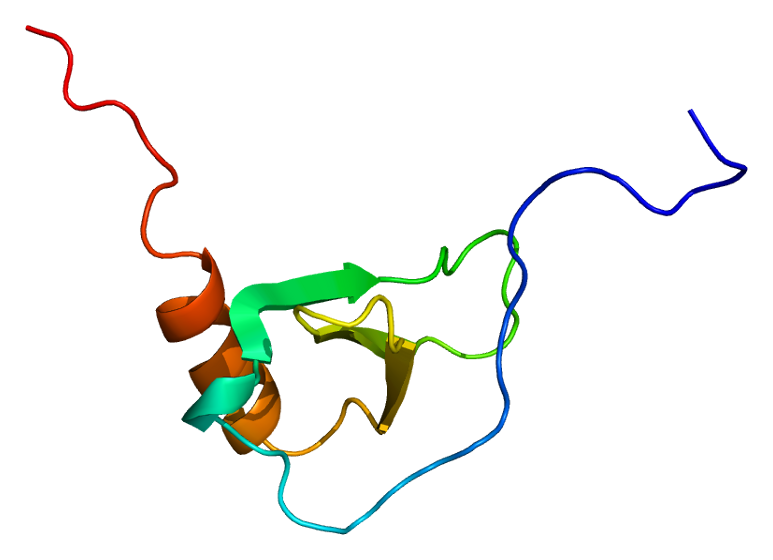

Identifiers
- Aliases: CCL7, FIC, MARC, MCP-3, MCP3, NC28, SCYA6, SCYA7, C-C motif chemokine ligand 7
- External IDs: OMIM: 158106; GeneCards: CCL7
Available structures
PDB	Human UniProt search: PDBe RCSB
PDB	List of PDB id codes 1BO0, 1NCV, 4ZKC

Gene location (Human)
Chr.	Chromosome 17 (human)
Band	17q12	Start	34,270,221 bp
Band	17q12	End	34,272,242 bp
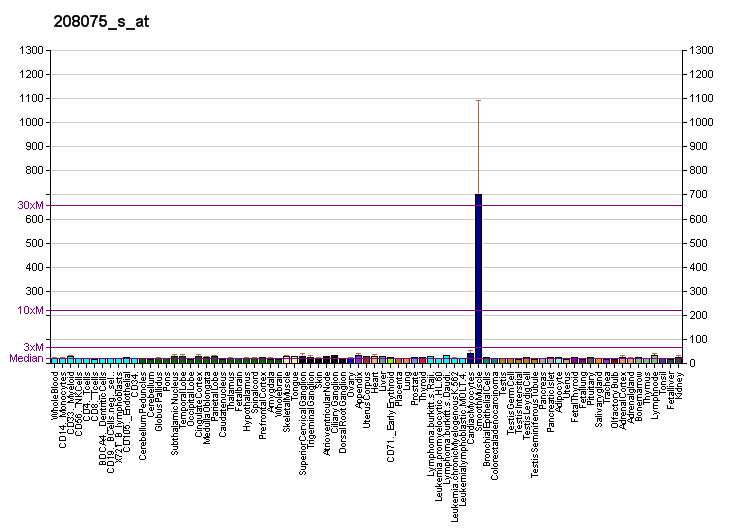
RNA expression pattern
Bgee	Human / Mouse (ortholog); Top expressed in: islet of Langerhans; mucosa of urinary bladder; stromal cell of endometrium; amniotic fluid; cartilage tissue; appendix; rectum; smooth muscle tissue; lower lobe of lung; parietal pleura / n/a; More reference expression data
BioGPS	More reference expression data
Gene ontology
Molecular function	cytokine activity; heparin binding; chemokine activity; CCR1 chemokine receptor binding; protein binding; CCR2 chemokine receptor binding; CCR chemokine receptor binding
Cellular component	extracellular region; extracellular space
Biological process	G protein-coupled receptor signaling pathway; monocyte chemotaxis; positive regulation of cell migration; positive regulation of natural killer cell chemotaxis; chemokine-mediated signaling pathway; cellular response to tumor necrosis factor; cell-cell signaling; eosinophil chemotaxis; cellular calcium ion homeostasis; neutrophil chemotaxis; chemotaxis; positive regulation of GTPase activity; cytoskeleton organization; cellular response to interleukin-1; immune response; positive regulation of ERK1 and ERK2 cascade; regulation of cell shape; cellular response to interferon-gamma; inflammatory response; signal transduction; response to gamma radiation; cellular response to ethanol; regulation of signaling receptor activity; lymphocyte chemotaxis
Sources:Amigo / QuickGO
Orthologs
Databases	NCBI: entry; OMA: entry
Species	Human	Mouse
Entrez	6354	n/a
Ensembl	ENSG00000108688	n/a
UniProt	P80098	n/a
RefSeq (mRNA)	NM_006273	n/a
RefSeq (protein)	NP_006264	n/a
Location (UCSC)	Chr 17: 34.27 – 34.27 Mb	n/a
PubMed search		n/a
- Wikidata
View/Edit Human

Chemokine (C-C motif) ligand 7 (CCL7) is a small cytokine that was previously called monocyte-chemotactic protein 3 (MCP3). CCL7 is a small protein that belongs to the CC chemokine family and is most closely related to CCL2 (previously called MCP1).

== Genomics ==
In the human genome, CCL7 is encoded by the CCL7 gene which is one of the several chemokine genes clustered on chromosome 17q11.2-q12. This region contains the gene for the MCP subset of CC chemokines. The CCL7 gene has been given the locus symbol SCYA7.

The gene consists of three exons and two introns. The first exon contains a 5′-untranslated region (5′-UTR), the information for the signal sequence (23 amino acids), and the mature protein's first two amino acids. The second exon encodes amino acids 3–42 of the mature proteins. The third exon is composed of the C-terminal region of the protein, a 3′-UTR containing one or more destabilizing AU-rich sequences and a polyadenylation signal.

== Molecular biology ==
CCL7 was first characterized from osteosarcoma supernatant. CCL7 consists of 99 amino acids, which contains 23-amino acid signal peptide. The mature protein about 76 amino acids is secreted after cleavage of the signal peptide. In contrast to most chemokines, CCL7 exists in a general monomeric form, differing from the dimer formed in a highly concentrated solution.

CCL7 can exist in four different glycotypes with a molecular weight 11, 13, 17 and 18 kDa in COS cells.

CCL7 mediates effects on the immune cell types through binding to numerous receptors, including CCR1, CCR2, CCR3, CCR5, and CCR10. These receptors belongs to the G protein-coupled seven-transmembrane receptors. CCL7 can also interact with cell surface glycosaminoglycans (GAGs) present on all animal cell surfaces.

== Function ==
CCL7 is expressed in many types of cells, including stromal cells, keratinocytes, airway smooth muscle cells, parenchymal cells, fibroblasts and leukocytes and also in tumor cells.

CCL7 mainly acts as a chemoattractant for several leukocytes, including monocytes, eosinophils, basophils, dendritic cells (DCs), neutrophils, NK cells and activated T lymphocytes. Thus, chemotactic factor CCL7 recruits leukocytes to infected tissues to mediate the immune response. Furthermore, CCL7 has an influence to diapedesis and extravasation of leukocytes. The positive effect of CCL7 is mainly observed in monocyte mobilization from bone marrow to blood circulation and in the recruitment of monocytes to sites of inflammation. It was also reported, that CCL7 can also induce neutrophil migration to the inflammatory site by increasing intracellular Ca2+ flux, which is more typical for the CXC chemokine family members.

The speed of immune responses varies depending on the type of the cells. In epithelial cells, fibroblasts, and endothelial cells the response is immediate after the stimulation by proinflammatory cytokines as IL-1β and TNFα. In T lymphocytes the expression of CCL7 occurs after 3–5 days after the stimulation.

CCL7 has been shown to interact with MMP2 by binding CCR2 receptor.

== Clinical importance ==
CCL7 is a multipotent chemokine involved in anti-bacterial, anti-viral and anti-fungal immune responses. For example, CCL7-mediated stimulation of CCR2 chemokine receptors on monocytes is participating in the elimination of Listeria monocytogenes infections by the recruitment of monocytes and TNF/iNOS-producing dendritic cells (TipDCs). Next, the role of the CCL7 was also observed in the mouse infected by West Nile Virus. The genetically deficient mice in CCL7 have increased mortality because of decrease in monocytes and neutrophils. Early induction of CCL7 downstream of TLR9 signaling also promotes the development of robust immunity to cryptococcal infections.

Diseases associated with CCL7 dysregulation are observed. For example, an abnormal increase of CCL7 worsens many disorders, like HIV or lesional psoriasis. Furthermore, CCL7 is implicated in various immunological diseases, as ulcerative colitis, multiple sclerosis or nonatopic and atopic asthma.

It seems, that the expression of CCL7 can activate an antitumor immune response.
