= Stress granule =

Cytoplasmic biomolecular condensates of proteins and RNA occurring in cells under stress

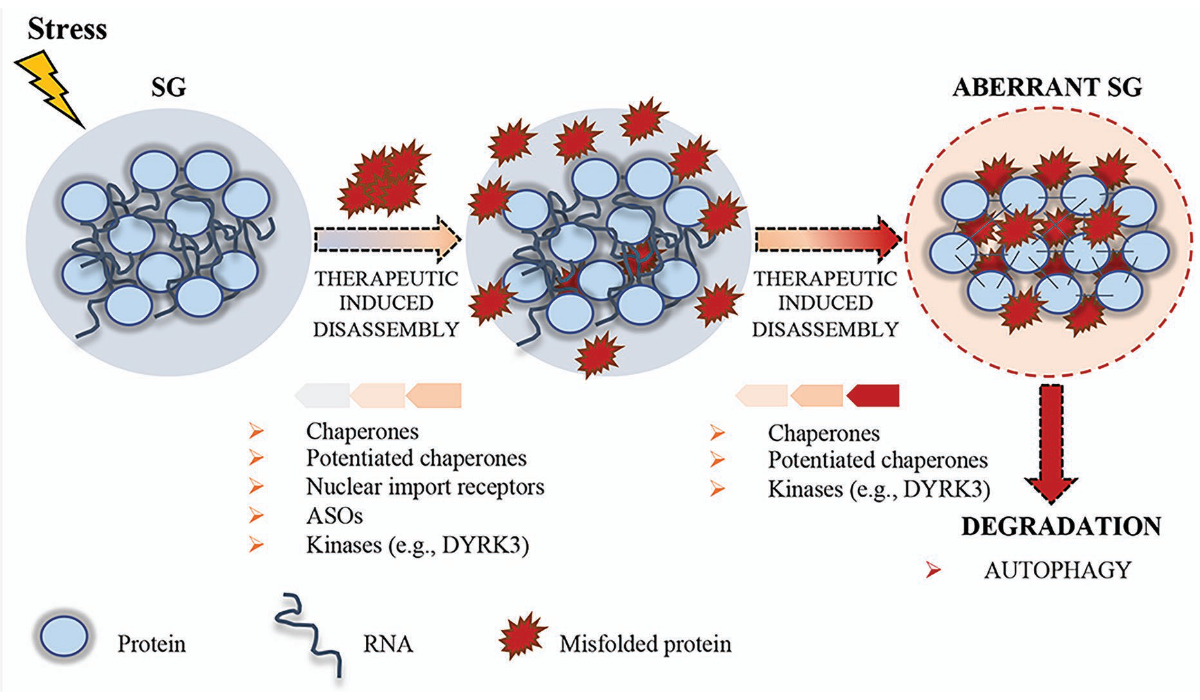
Stress granule dynamics

In cellular biology, stress granules are biomolecular condensates in the cytosol composed of proteins and RNA that assemble into 0.1–2 μm membraneless organelles when the cell is under stress. The mRNA molecules found in stress granules are stalled translation pre-initiation complexes associated with 40S ribosomal subunits, translation initiation factors, poly(A)+ mRNA and RNA-binding proteins (RBPs). While they are membraneless organelles, stress granules have been proposed to be associated with the endoplasmatic reticulum. There are also nuclear stress granules. This article is about the cytosolic variety.

== Proposed functions ==
The function of stress granules remains largely unknown. Stress granules have long been proposed to have a function to protect RNA from harmful conditions, thus their appearance under stress. The accumulation of RNA into dense globules could keep them from reacting with harmful chemicals and safeguard the information coded in their RNA sequence.

Stress granules might also function as a decision point for untranslated mRNA. Molecules can go down one of three paths: further storage, degradation, or re-initiation of translation. Conversely, it has also been argued that stress granules are not important sites for mRNA storage nor do they serve as an intermediate location for mRNA in transit between a state of storage and a state of degradation.

Efforts to identify all RNA within stress granules (the stress granule transcriptome) in an unbiased way by sequencing RNA from biochemically purified stress granule "cores" have shown that RNA are not recruited to stress granules in a sequence-specific manner, but rather generically, with longer and/or less-optimally translated transcripts being enriched. These data imply that the stress granule transcriptome is influenced by the valency of RNA (for proteins or other RNA) and by the rates of RNA run-off from polysomes. The latter is further supported by recent single molecule imaging studies. Furthermore, it was estimated that only about 15% of the total mRNA in the cell is localized to stress granules, suggesting that stress granules only influence a minority of mRNA in the cell and may not be as important for mRNA processing as previously thought. That said, these studies represent only a snapshot in time, and it is likely that a larger fraction of mRNA are at one point stored in stress granules due to those RNA transiting in and out.

The stress proteins that are the main component of stress granules in plant cells are molecular chaperones that sequester, protect, and possibly repair proteins that unfold during heat and other types of stress. Therefore, any association of mRNA with stress granules may simply be a side effect of the association of partially unfolded RNA-binding proteins with stress granules, similar to the association of mRNA with proteasomes.

=== RNA damage ===
DHX9 is a distinct stress granule that has helicase activity capable of acting on double-stranded RNA, but not on DNA, to promote cell survival. DHX9 acts as a non-membrane bound cytoplasmic compartment to safeguard daughter cells from parental RNA damage. Assembly of DHX9 stress granules appears to be a dedicated mechanism in mammalian cells for protecting against RNA crosslinking damage.

== Formation ==
Environmental stressors trigger cellular signaling, eventually leading to the formation of stress granules. In vitro, these stressors can include heat, cold, oxidative stress (sodium arsenite), endoplasmic reticulum stress (thapsigargin), proteasome inhibition (MG132), hyperosmotic stress, ultraviolet radiation, inhibition of eIF4A (pateamine A, hippuristanol, or RocA), nitric oxide accumulation after treatment with 3-morpholinosydnonimine (SIN-1), perturbation of pre-mRNA splicing, and other stressors, like puromycin, which result in disassembled polysomes. Many of these stressors result in the activation of particular stress-associated kinases (HRI, PERK, PKR, and GCN2), translational inhibition and stress granule formation. Stress granules will also form upon Gαq activation in a mechanism that involves the release of stress granule associated proteins from the cytosolic population of the Gαq effector phospholipase Cβ.

Stress granule formation is often downstream of the stress-activated phosphorylation of eukaryotic translation initiation factor eIF2α; this does not hold true for all types of stressors that induce stress granules, for instance, eIF4A inhibition. Further downstream, prion-like aggregation of the protein TIA-1 promotes the formation of stress granules. The term prion-like is used because aggregation of TIA-1 is concentration dependent, inhibited by chaperones, and because the aggregates are resistant to proteases. It has also been proposed that microtubules play a role in the formation of stress granules, perhaps by transporting granule components. This hypothesis is based on the fact that disruption of microtubules with the chemical nocodazole blocks the appearance of the granules. Furthermore, many signaling molecules have been shown to regulate the formation or dynamics of stress granules; these include the "master energy sensor" AMP-activated protein kinase (AMPK), the O-GlcNAc transferase enzyme (OGT), and the pro-apoptotic kinase ROCK1.

=== Potential roles of RNA-RNA interactions ===
RNA phase transitions driven in part by intermolecular RNA-RNA interactions may play a role in stress granule formation. Similar to intrinsically disordered proteins, total RNA extracts are capable of undergoing phase separation in physiological conditions in vitro. RNA-seq analyses demonstrate that these assemblies share a largely overlapping transcriptome with stress granules, with RNA enrichment in both being predominately based on the length of the RNA. Further, stress granules contain many RNA helicases, including the DEAD/H-box helicases Ded1p/DDX3, eIF4A1, and RHAU. In yeast, catalytic ded1 mutant alleles give rise to constitutive stress granules ATPase-deficient DDX3X (the mammalian homolog of Ded1) mutant alleles are found in pediatric medulloblastoma, and these coincide with constitutive granular assemblies in patient cells. These mutant DDX3 proteins promote stress granule assembly in HeLa cells. In mammalian cells, RHAU mutants lead to reduced stress granule dynamics. Thus, some hypothesize that RNA aggregation facilitated by intermolecular RNA-RNA interactions plays a role in stress granule formation, and that this role may be regulated by RNA helicases. There is also evidence that RNA within stress granules is more compacted, compared to RNA in the cytoplasm, and that the RNA is found to be post-translationally modified by N6-methyladenosine (m^{6}A) on its 5' ends or RNA acetylation ac4C. Recent work has shown that the highly abundant translation initiation factor and DEAD-box protein eIF4A limits stress granule formation. It does so through its ability to bind ATP and RNA, acting analogously to protein chaperones like Hsp70.

== Connection with processing bodies ==
Stress granules and P-bodies (processing bodies) share RNA and protein components, both appear under stress, and can physically associate with one another. As of 2018, of the ~660 proteins identified as localizing to stress granules, ~11% also have been identified as processing body-localized proteins (see below). The protein G3BP1 is necessary for the proper docking of processing bodies and stress granules to each other, which may be important for the preservation of polyadenylated mRNA.

Although some protein components are shared between stress granules and processing bodies, the majority of proteins in either structure are uniquely localized to either structure. While both stress granules and P-bodies are associated with mRNA, processing bodies have been long proposed to be sites of mRNA degradation because they contain enzymes such as DCP1/2 and XRN1 that are known to degrade mRNA. However, others have demonstrated that mRNA associated with processing bodies are largely translationally repressed but not degraded. It has also been proposed that mRNA selected for degradation are passed from stress granules to processing bodies, though there is also data suggesting that processing bodies precede and promote stress granule formation.

== Protein composition of stress granules ==
The complete proteome of stress granules is still unknown, but efforts have been made to catalog all of the proteins that have been experimentally demonstrated to transit into stress granules. Importantly, different stressors can result in stress granules with different protein components. Many stress granule-associated proteins have been identified by transiently stressing cultured cells and utilizing microscopy to detect the localization of a protein of interest either by expressing that protein fused to a fluorescent protein (i.e. green fluorescent protein (GFP)) and/or by fixing cells and using antibodies to detect the protein of interest along with known protein markers of stress granules (immunocytochemistry).

In 2016, stress granule "cores" were experimentally identified and then biochemically purified for the first time. Proteins in the cores were identified in an unbiased manner using mass spectrometry. This technical advance lead to the identification of hundreds of new stress granule-localized proteins.

The proteome of stress granules has also been experimentally determined by using two slightly different proximity labeling approaches. One of these proximity labeling approaches is the ascorbate peroxidase (APEX) method, in which cells are engineered to express a known stress granule protein, such as G3BP1, fused to a modified ascorbate peroxidase enzyme called APEX. Upon incubating the cells in biotin and treating the cells with hydrogen peroxide, the APEX enzyme will be briefly activated to biotinylate all proteins in close proximity to the protein of interest, in this case G3BP1 within stress granules. Proteins that are biotinylated can then be isolated via streptavidin and identified using mass spectrometry. The APEX technique was used to identify ~260 stress granule-associated proteins in several cell types, including neurons, and with various stressors. Of the 260 proteins identified in this study, ~143 had not previously been demonstrated to be stress granule-associated.

Another proximity labeling method used to determine the proteome of stress granules is BioID. BioID is similar to the APEX approach, in that a biotinylating protein (BirA* instead of APEX) was expressed in cells as a fusion protein with several known stress granule-associated proteins. Proteins in close proximity to BirA* will be biotinylated and are then identified by mass spectrometry. Youn et al. used this method to identify/predict 138 proteins as stress granule-associated and 42 as processing body-associated.

A curated database of stress granule-associated proteins can be found here .

The following is a list of proteins that have been demonstrated to localize to stress granules (compiled from):

Gene ID	Protein Name	Description	References	Also found in processing bodies?
ABCF1	ABCF1	ATP Binding Cassette Subfamily F Member 1		
ABRACL	ABRACL	ABRA C-Terminal Like		
ACAP1	ACAP1	ArfGAP With Coiled-Coil, Ankyrin Repeat And PH Domains 1		
ACBD5	ACBD5	Acyl-CoA Binding Domain Containing 5		
ACTBL2	ACTBL2	Beta-actin-like protein 2		yes
ACTR1A	ACTR1A	Alpha-centractin		
ACTR1B	ACTR1B	Beta-centractin		
ADAR	ADAR1	Adenosine Deaminase, RNA Specific		
ADD1	Adducin 1	Adducin 1		
AGO1	Argonaute 1/EIF2C1	Argonaute 1, RISC Catalytic Component		yes
AGO2	Argonaute 2	Argonaute 2, RISC Catalytic Component		yes
AKAP8	AKAP8	A-Kinase Anchoring Protein 8		
AKAP9	AKAP350	A-Kinase Anchoring Protein 9		
AKAP13	AKAP13/LBC	A-Kinase Anchoring Protein 13		
ALDH18A1	ALDH18A1	Delta-1-pyrroline-5-carboxylate synthase		
ALG13	ALG13	ALG13, UDP-N-Acetylglucosaminyltransferase Subunit		
ALPK2	ALPK2/HAK	Alpha Kinase 2		
AMOTL2	AMOTL2/LCCP	Angiomotin Like 2		
ANKHD1	ANKHD1	Ankyrin Repeat and KH Domain Containing 1		yes
ANKRD17	ANKRD17/MASK2/GTAR	Ankyrin Repeat Domain 17		yes
ANG	Angiogenin	Angiogenin		
ANP32E	ANP32E	Acidic leucine-rich nuclear phosphoprotein 32 family member E		
ANXA1	ANXA1	Annexin A1		
ANXA11	ANXA11	Annexin 11		
ANXA6	ANXA6	Annexin 6		
ANXA7	ANXA7	Annexin 7		
APEX1	APEX1	DNA-(apurinic or apyrimidinic site) lyase		
APOBEC3C	APOBEC3C	Apolipoprotein B mRNA Editing Enzyme Catalytic Subunit 3C		
APOBEC3G	APOBEC3G	Apolipoprotein B mRNA Editing Enzyme Catalytic Subunit 3G		
ARID2	ARID2/BAF200	AT-Rich Interaction Domain 2		
ARPC1B	ARPC1B	Actin-related protein 2/3 complex subunit 1B		
AHSA1	AHA1	Activator Of HSP90 ATPase Activity 1		
AQR	AQR/IBP160	Aquarius Intron-Binding Spliceosomal Factor		
ARMC6	ARMC6	Armadillo Repeat Containing 6		
ASCC1	ASCC1	Activating Signal Cointegrator 1 Complex Subunit 1		
ASCC3	ASCC3	Activating Signal Cointegrator 1 Complex Subunit 3		
ATAD2	ATAD2	ATPase family AAA domain-containing protein 2		
ATAD3A	ATAD3A	ATPase family AAA domain-containing protein 3A		yes
ATG3	ATG3	Autophagy Related 3		
ATP5F1A	ATP5F1A	ATP synthase subunit alpha, mitochondrial		
ATP6V1G1	ATP6V1G1/ATP6G	ATPase H+ Transporting V1 Subunit G1		
ATXN2	Ataxin 2	Ataxin 2		
ATXN2L	Ataxin-2 like	Ataxin 2 Like		
BAG3	BAG3	BAG family molecular chaperone regulator 3		
BANF1	BANF1	Barrier-to-autointegration factor		
BAZ1B	BAZ1B	Bromodomain Adjacent To Zinc Finger Domain 1B		
BAZ2A	BAZ2A	Bromodomain Adjacent To Zinc Finger Domain 2A		
BCCIP	BCCIP	BRCA2 And CDKN1A Interacting Protein		
BCLAF1	BCLAF1	BCL2 Associated Transcription Factor 1		
BICC1	BICC1	BicC Family RNA Binding Protein 1		
BIRC2	BIRC2/CIAP1	Baculoviral IAP Repeat Containing 2		
BLM	BLM	BLM RecQ Like Helicase		
BOD1L1	BOD1L1/FAM44A	Biorientation Of Chromosomes In Cell Division 1 Like 1		
BOLL	BOULE	Boule Homolog, RNA Binding Protein		
BRAT1	BRAT1	BRCA1-associated ATM activator 1		
BRF1	BRF1	BRF1, butyrate response factor-1		
BTG3	BTG3	BTG Anti-Proliferation Factor 3		yes
C9orf72	C9orf72	Uncharacterized protein C9orf72		
CCDC9B	CCDC9B	Coiled-Coil Domain Containing 9B		
C20orf27	C20orf72	Chromosome 20 Open Reading Frame 27		
C2CD3	C2CD3	C2 Calcium Dependent Domain Containing 3		
CALML5	CALML5	Calmodulin-like protein 5		
CALR	Calreticulin/CRT	Calreticulin		
CAMSAP1	CAMSAP1	Calmodulin Regulated Spectrin Associated Protein 1		
CAP1	CAP1	Adenylyl cyclase-associated protein 1		
CAPRIN1	Caprin-1	Cell Cycle Associated Protein 1		
CAPZA2	CAPZA2	F-actin-capping protein subunit alpha-2		
CAPZB	CAPZB	Capping Actin Protein Of Muscle Z-Line Subunit Beta		
CARHSP1	CARHSP1	Calcium-regulated heat stable protein 1		
CASC3	MLN51/BTZ	Cancer Susceptibility 3		
CBFB	CBFB	Core-binding factor subunit beta		
CBS	CBS	Cystathionine Beta-Synthase		
CBX1	CBX1	Chromobox protein homolog 1		
CBX3	CBX3	Chromobox protein homolog 3		
CCAR1	CARP-1	Cell Division Cycle and Apoptosis Regulator 1		
CCDC9	CCDC9	Coiled-Coil Domain Containing 9		
CCDC9B	CCDC9B	Coiled-Coil Domain Containing 9B		
CCDC124	CCDC124	Coiled-Coil Domain Containing 124		
CCDC85C	CCDC85C	Coiled-Coil Domain Containing 85C		
CCT3	CCT3	T-complex protein 1 subunit gamma		
CCT6A	CCT6A	T-complex protein 1 subunit zeta		
CDC20	CDC20	Cell Division Cycle 20		
CDC37	CDC37	Cell Division Cycle 37		
CDC5L	CDC5L	Cell division cycle 5-like protein		
CDC73	CDC73	Parafibromin		
CDK1	CDK1	Cyclin-dependent kinase 1		
CDK2	CDK2	Cyclin Dependent Kinase 2		
CDV3	CDV3	CDV3 Homolog		
CELF1	CUGBP1	CUGBP Elav-Like Family Member 1		
CELF2	CUGBP2/BRUNOL3	CUGBP Elav-Like Family Member 2		
CELF3	CUGBP3/BRUNOL1	CUGBP Elav-Like Family Member 3		
CENPB	CENPB	Major centromere autoantigen B		
CENPF	CENPF	Centromere Protein F		
CEP78	CEP78/CRDHL	Centrosomal Protein 78		
CEP85	CEP85/CCDC21	Centrosomal Protein 78		
CERKL	Ceramide-Kinase Like	Ceramide Kinase Like		
CFL1	Cofilin-1	Cofilin-1		
CHCHD3	CHCHD3	Coiled-coil-helix-coiled-coil-helix domain-containing protein 3, mitochondrial		
CHORDC1	CHORDC1/CHP1	Cysteine and histidine-rich domain-containing protein 1		
CIRBP	CIRP	Cold Inducible RNA Binding Protein		
CIT	CIT	Citron Rho-interacting kinase		
CLIC4	CLIC4	Chloride intracellular channel protein 4		
CLNS1A	CLNS1A	Chloride Nucleotide-Sensitive Channel 1A		
CLPP	CLPP	Caseinolytic Mitochondrial Matrix Peptidase Proteolytic Subunit		
CNBP	ZNF9	CCHC-Type Zinc Finger Nucleic Acid Binding Protein		
CNN3	CNN3	Calponin-3		
CNOT1	CNOT1/CCR4	CCR4-Not Transcription Complex Subunit 1		yes
CNOT10	CNOT10	CCR4-Not Transcription Complex Subunit 10		yes
CNOT11	CNOT11	CCR4-Not Transcription Complex Subunit 11		yes
CNOT2	CNOT2	CCR4-Not Transcription Complex Subunit 2		yes
CNOT3	CNOT3	CCR4-Not Transcription Complex Subunit 3		yes
CNOT4	CNOT4	CCR4-Not Transcription Complex Subunit 4		yes
CNOT6	CNOT6	CCR4-Not Transcription Complex Subunit 6		yes
CNOT6L	CNOT6L	CCR4-Not Transcription Complex Subunit 6L		yes
CNOT7	CNOT7	CCR4-Not Transcription Complex Subunit 7		yes
CNOT8	CNOT8	CCR4-Not Transcription Complex Subunit 8		yes
CNOT9	CNOT9	CCR4-Not Transcription Complex Subunit 9		
CORO1B	CORO1B	Coronin-1B		
CPB2	Carboxypeptidase B2	Carboxypeptidase B2		
CPEB1	CPEB	Cytoplasmic Polyadenylation Element Binding Protein 1		
CPEB4	CPEB4	Cytoplasmic Polyadenylation Element Binding Protein 4		yes
CPSF3	CPSF3	Cleavage and polyadenylation specificity factor subunit 3		
CPSF6	CPSF6	Cleavage and polyadenylation specificity factor subunit 6		
CPSF7	CPSF7	Cleavage and polyadenylation specificity factor subunit 7		
CPVL	CPVL	Carboxypeptidase, Vitellogenic Like		yes
CRKL	CRKL	CRK Like Proto-Oncogene, Adaptor Protein		
CROCC	CROCC	Ciliary Rootlet Coiled-Coil, Rootletin		
CRYAB	CRYAB	Alpha-crystallin B chain		
CRYBG1	CRYBG1	Crystallin Beta-Gamma Domain Containing 1		
CSDE1	CSDE1	Cold shock domain-containing protein E1		
CSE1L	CSE1L/XPO2/Exportin-2	Exportin-2		
CSNK2A1	Casein Kinase 2 alpha	Casein Kinase 2 Alpha 1		
CSTB	Cystatin B	Cystatin B		
CSTF1	CSTF1	Cleavage stimulation factor subunit 1		
CTNNA2	CTNNA2	Catenin alpha-2		
CTNND1	CTNND1	Catenin delta-1		
CTTNBP2NL	CTTNBP2NL	CTTNBP2 N-terminal-like protein		
CWC22	CWC22	Pre-mRNA-splicing factor CWC22 homolog		
DAZAP1	DAZAP1	DAZ-associated protein 1		
DAZAP2	PRTB	DAZ Associated Protein 2		
DAZL	DAZL1	Deleted In Azoospermia Like		
DCD	DCD	Dermcidin		
DCP1A	DCP1a	Decapping mRNA 1a		yes
DCP1B	DCP1b	Decapping mRNA 1b		yes
DCP2	DCP2	Decapping mRNA 2		
DCTN1	DCTN1	Dynactin subunit 1		
DDX1	DEAD box protein 1	DEAD-Box Helicase 1		
DDX11	DEAD box protein 11	DEAD-Box Helicase 11		
DDX19A	DDX19A	ATP-dependent RNA helicase DDX19A		
DDX21	DDX21	Nucleolar RNA helicase 2		yes
DDX3	DEAD box protein 3	DEAD-Box Helicase 3		
DDX3X	DDX3X	DEAD-Box Helicase 3, X-Linked		
DDX3Y	DDX3Y	DEAD-Box Helicase 3, Y-Linked		
DDX31	DDX31	DEAD-Box Helicase 31		
DDX47	DDX47	Probable ATP-dependent RNA helicase DDX47		
DDX50	DDX50	ATP-dependent RNA helicase DDX50		yes
DDX58	RIG-I	DExD/H-Box Helicase 58		
DDX6	DEAD box protein 6	DEAD-Box Helicase 6		yes
DERA	DERA	Deoxyribose-Phosphate Aldolase		
DGCR8	DGCR8	DGCR8 Microprocessor Complex Subunit		
DHX30	DHX30	Putative ATP-dependent RNA helicase DHX30		yes
DHX33	DHX33	DEAH-Box Helicase 33		
DHX36	RHAU	DEAH-Box Helicase 36		
DHX57	DHX57	DExH-Box Helicase 57		
DHX58	LGP2	DExH-Box Helicase 58		
DIDO1	DIDO1	Death Inducer-Obliterator 1		
DIS3L2	DIS3L2/FAM3A	DIS3 Like 3'-5' Exoribonuclease 2		
DISC1	Disrupted in Schizophrenia 1	Disrupted In Schizophrenia 1		
DKC1	DKC1	dyskerin; H/ACA ribonucleoprotein complex subunit 4		
DNAI1	Axonemal Dynein Intermediate Chain 1	Dynein Axonemal Intermediate Chain 1		
DNAJA1	DNAJA1	DnaJ homolog subfamily A member 1		
DNAJC8	DNAJC8	DnaJ homolog subfamily C member 8		
DOCK4	DOCK4	Dedicator Of Cytokinesis 4		
DPYSL2	DPYSL2	Dihydropyrimidinase-related protein 2		
DPYSL3	DPYSL3	Dihydropyrimidinase-related protein 3		
DROSHA	DROSHA	Drosha Ribonuclease III		
DSP	DSP	Desmoplakin		
DST	DST	Dystonin		
DSTN	DSTN	Destrin		
DTL	DTL	Denticleless E3 Ubiquitin Protein Ligase Homolog		
DTX3L	DTX3L	E3 ubiquitin-protein ligase DTX3L		
DUSP12	DUSP12/YVH1	Dual Specificity Phosphatase 12		
DYNC1H1	Cytoplasmic Dynein Heavy Chain 1	Dynein Cytoplasmic 1 Heavy Chain 1		
DYNLL1	Cytoplasmic Dynein Light Polypeptide	Dynein Light Chain LC8-Type 1		
DYNLL2	DYNLL2	Dynein light chain 2, cytoplasmic		
DYRK3	DYRK3	Dual Specificity Tyrosine Phosphorylation Regulated Kinase 3		
DZIP1	DZIP1	DAZ Interacting Zinc Finger Protein 1		
DZIP3	DZIP3	DAZ Interacting Zinc Finger Protein 3		
EDC3	EDC3	Enhancer of mRNA Decapping 3		yes
EDC4	EDC4	Enhancer of mRNA-Decapping protein 4		yes
EIF1	EIF1	Eukaryotic Translation Initiation Factor 1		
EIF2A	EIF2A	Eukaryotic Translation Initiation Factor 2A		
EIF2AK2	Protein Kinase R/PKR	Eukaryotic Translation Initiation Factor 2 Alpha Kinase 2		
EIF2B1-5	EIF2B	Eukaryotic Translation Initiation Factor 2B		
EIF2S1	EIF2A subunit 1	Eukaryotic Translation Initiation Factor 2 Subunit Alpha		
EIF2S2	EIF2A subunit 2	Eukaryotic Translation Initiation Factor 2 Subunit Beta		
EIF3A	EIF3A	Eukaryotic Translation Initiation Factor 3 Subunit A		
EIF3B	EIF3B	Eukaryotic Translation Initiation Factor 3 Subunit B		
EIF3C	EIF3C	Eukaryotic Translation Initiation Factor 3 Subunit C		
EIF3D	EIF3D	Eukaryotic translation initiation factor 3 subunit D		
EIF3E	EIF3E	Eukaryotic translation initiation factor 3 subunit E		
EIF3F	EIF3F	Eukaryotic translation initiation factor 3 subunit F		
EIF3G	EIF3G	Eukaryotic translation initiation factor 3 subunit G		
EIF3H	EIF3H	Eukaryotic translation initiation factor 3 subunit H		
EIF3I	EIF3I	Eukaryotic translation initiation factor 3 subunit I		
EIF3J	EIF3J	Eukaryotic translation initiation factor 3 subunit J		
EIF3K	EIF3K	Eukaryotic translation initiation factor 3 subunit K		
EIF3L	EIF3L	Eukaryotic translation initiation factor 3 subunit L		
EIF3M	EIF3M	Eukaryotic translation initiation factor 3 subunit M		
EIF4A1	EIF4A1	Eukaryotic Translation Initiation Factor 4A1		
EIF4A2	EIF4A2	Eukaryotic Translation Initiation Factor 4A2		
EIF4A3	EIF4A3	Eukaryotic Translation Initiation Factor 4A3		
EIF4B	EIF4B	Eukaryotic translation Initiation factor 4B		
EIF4E	EIF4E	Eukaryotic Translation Initiation Factor 4E		yes
EIF4E2	EIF4E2	Eukaryotic Translation Initiation Factor 4E Family Member 2		yes
EIF4E3	EIF4E3	Eukaryotic Translation Initiation Factor 4E Family Member 3		
EIF4ENIF1	EIF4ENIF1	Eukaryotic Translation Initiation Factor 4E Nuclear Import Factor 1		yes
EIF4G1	EIF4G1	Eukaryotic Translation Initiation Factor 4G1		
EIF4G2	EIF4G2	Eukaryotic Translation Initiation Factor 4G2		
EIF4G3	EIF4G3	Eukaryotic Translation Initiation Factor 4G3		
EIF4H	EIF4H	Eukaryotic translation Initiation factor 4H		
EIF5A	EIF5A	Eukaryotic Translation Initiation Factor 5A		
ELAVL1	HuR	ELAV Like RNA Binding Protein 1		yes
ELAVL2	ELAVL2	ELAV-like protein 2		yes
ELAVL3	ELAVL3/HuC	ELAV Like RNA Binding Protein 3		
ELAVL4	HuD	ELAV Like RNA Binding Protein 4		
ENC1	ENC1	Ectodermal-Neural Cortex 1		
ENDOV	EndoV	Endonuclease V		
ENTPD1	ENTPD1	Ectonucleoside Triphosphate Diphosphohydrolase 1		
EP400	EP400	E1A Binding Protein P400		
EPPK1	EPPK1	Epiplakin		
ETF1	ETF1	Eukaryotic peptide chain release factor subunit 1		
EWSR1	EWSR1	EWS RNA Binding Protein 1		
FABP5	FABP5	Fatty Acid Binding Protein 5		
FAM120A	FAM120A/OSSA	Constitutive coactivator of PPAR-gamma-like protein 1		yes
FAM120C	FAM120C	Family With Sequence Similarity 120C		
FAM168A	FAM168A	Family With Sequence Similarity 168 Member A		
FAM168B	FAM168B/MANI	Family With Sequence Similarity 168 Member B		
FAM83H	FAM83H	Family With Sequence Similarity 83 Member H		
FAM98A	FAM98A	Family With Sequence Similarity 98 Member A		
FAM98C	FAM98C	Family With Sequence Similarity 98 Member C		
FASTK	FAST	Fas Activated Serine/Threonine Kinase		yes
FBL	FBL	rRNA 2-O-methyltransferase fibrillarin		
FBRSL1	Fibrosin Like 1	Fibrosin Like 1		
FHL1	FHL1	Four and a half LIM domains protein 1		
FKBP1A	FKBP1A	FKBP Prolyl Isomerase 1A		
FLNB	FLNB	Filamin-B		
FMR1	FMRP	Fragile X Mental Retardation 1		
FNDC3B	FNDC3B	Fibronectin type III domain-containing protein 3B		
FSCN1	FSCN1	Fascin		
FTSJ3	FTSJ3	pre-rRNA processing protein FTSJ3		
FUBP1	FUBP1	Far Upstream Element Binding Protein 1		
FUBP3	FUBP3	Far upstream element-binding protein 3		
FUS	FUS	FUS RNA Binding Protein		
FXR1	FXR1	FMR1 Autosomal Homolog 1		
FXR2	FXR2	FMR1 Autosomal Homolog 2		
G3BP1	G3BP1	G3BP Stress Granule Assembly Factor 1		
G3BP2	G3BP2	G3BP Stress Granule Assembly Factor 2		
GABARAPL2	GABARAPL2/GEF2/ATG8	GABA Type A Receptor Associated Protein Like 2		
GAK	GAK	Cyclin G Associated Kinase		
GAR1	GAR1	H/ACA Ribonucleoprotein Complex Subunit 1		
GCA	Grancalcin	Grancalcin		
GEMIN5	Gemin-5	Gem Nuclear Organelle Associated Protein 5		
GFPT1	GFPT1	Glutamine—fructose-6-phosphate aminotransferase [isomerizing] 1		
GIGYF1	GIGYF1/PERQ1	GRB10 Interacting GYF Protein 1		
GIGYF2	GIGYF2/TNRC15/PARK11/PERQ2	GRB10 Interacting GYF Protein 2		yes
GLE1	GLE1	GLE1, RNA Export Mediator		
GLO1	Glyoxalase	Glyoxalase		
GLRX3	GLRX3/Glutaredoxin 3/TNLX2	Glutaredoxin 3		
GLUD1	GLUD1	Glutamate Dehydrogenase 1		
GNB2	GNB2	Guanine nucleotide-binding protein G(I)/G(S)/G(T) subunit beta-2		
GOLGA2	Golgin A2	Golgin A2		
GPAT3	GPAT3	Glycerol-3-Phosphate Acyltransferase 3		
GRB2	GRB2/ASH	Growth Factor Receptor Bound Protein 2		
GRB7	GRB7	Growth Factor Receptor Bound Protein 7		
GRSF1	GRSF1	G-Rich RNA Sequence Binding Factor 1		
GSPT1	eRF3	G1 To S Phase Transition 1		
GTF2I	GTF2I	General Transcription Factor IIi		
GTF3C1	GTF3C1	General Transcription Factor IIIC Subunit 1		
GTF3C4	GTF3C4	General Transcription Factor IIIC Subunit 4		
H1F0	H1F0	Histone H1.0		
H1FX	H1FX	Histone H1x		
H2AFV	H2AFV	Histone H2A.V		
HABP4	Ki-1/57	Hyaluronan Binding Protein 4		
HDAC6	HDAC6	Histone Deacetylase 6		
HDLBP	HDL-Binding Protein/VGL/Vigilin	High Density Lipoprotein Binding Protein		
HELZ	HELZ	Probable helicase with zinc finger domain		yes
HELZ2	HELZ2	Helicase with zinc finger domain 2		
HMGA1	HMGA1	High mobility group protein HMG-I/HMG-Y		
HMGB3	HMGB3	High mobility group protein B3		
HMGN1	HMGN1	Non-histone chromosomal protein HMG-14		
HNRNPA1	HnRNPA1	Heterogeneous Nuclear Ribonucleoprotein A1		
HNRNPA2B1	HnRNPA2/B1	Heterogeneous Nuclear Ribonucleoprotein A2/B1		
HNRNPA3	HNRNPA3	Heterogeneous nuclear ribonucleoprotein A3		
HNRNPAB	HNRNPAB	Heterogeneous nuclear ribonucleoprotein A/B		
HNRNPD	HNRNPD	Heterogeneous nuclear ribonucleoprotein D		
HNRNPDL	HNRNPDL	Heterogeneous nuclear ribonucleoprotein D-like		
HNRNPF	HNRNPF	Heterogeneous nuclear ribonucleoprotein F		
HNRNPH1	HNRNPH1	Heterogeneous nuclear ribonucleoprotein H1		
HNRNPH2	HNRNPH2	Heterogeneous nuclear ribonucleoprotein H2		
HNRNPH3	HNRNPH3	Heterogeneous nuclear ribonucleoprotein H3		
HNRNPK	HNRNPK	Heterogeneous Nuclear Ribonucleoprotein K		
HNRNPUL1	HNRNPUL1	Heterogeneous nuclear ribonucleoprotein U-like protein 2		
HSBP1	HSBP1	Heat Shock Factor Binding Protein 1		
HSP90AA1	HSP90	Heat shock protein HSP 90-alpha		
HSPA4	HSP70 RY	Heat shock 70 kDa protein 4		
HSPA9	HSP70 9B	Stress-70 protein, mitochondrial		
HSPB1	HSP27	Heat Shock Protein Family B (Small) Member 1		yes
HSPB8	HSPB8	Heat Shock Protein Family B (Small) Member 8		
HSPBP1	HSPBP1	HSPA (Hsp70) Binding Protein 1		
HSPD1	HSPD1	60 kDa heat shock protein, mitochondrial		
HTT	Huntingtin	Huntingtin		
IBTK	IBTK	Inhibitor Of Bruton Tyrosine Kinase		
IFIH1	MDA5	Interferon Induced With Helicase C Domain 1		
IGF2BP1	IGF2BP1	Insulin-like Growth Factor 2 mRNA-binding protein 1		yes
IGF2BP2	IGF2BP2	Insulin-like Growth Factor 2 mRNA-binding protein 2		yes
IGF2BP3	IGF2BP3	Insulin-like Growth Factor 2 mRNA Binding Protein 3		yes
IK	IK	Protein Red		
ILF3	NF90	Interleukin Enhancer Binding Factor 3		yes
IPO7	IPO7	Importin-7		
IPPK	IP5K	Inositol-Pentakisphosphate 2-Kinase		
ITGB1	ITGB1	Integrin beta-1		
JMJD6	JMJD6	Arginine Demethylase and Lysine Hydroxylase		
KANK2	KANK2	KN motif and ankyrin repeat domain-containing protein 2		
KEAP1	KEAP1/KLHL19	Kelch Like ECH Associated Protein 1		
KHDRBS1	Sam68	KH RNA Binding Domain Containing, Signal Transduction Associated 1		
KHDRBS3	KHDRBS3	KH domain-containing, RNA-binding, signal transduction-associated protein 3		
KHSRP	KSRP/FBP2	KH-Type Splicing Regulatory Protein		
KIAA0232	KIAA0232	KIAA0232		yes
KIAA1524	CIP2A	Protein CIP2A		
KIF1B	KIF1B	Kinesin Family Member 1B		
KIF13B	KIF13B/GAKIN	Kinesin Family Member 13B		
KIF23	KIF23	Kinesin-like protein KIF23		yes
KIF2A	Kinesin Heavy Chain Member 2	Kinesin Family Member 2A		
KLC1	Kinesin Light Chain 1	Kinesin Light Chain 1		
KPNA1	Importin-ɑ5	Karyopherin Subunit Alpha 1		
KPNA2	Importin-ɑ1	Karyopherin Subunit Alpha 2		
KPNA3	Importin-ɑ4	Karyopherin Subunit Alpha 3		
KPNA6	Importin-ɑ7	Importin subunit alpha		
KPNB1	Importin-β1	Karyopherin Subunit Beta 1		
L1RE1	LINE1 ORF1p	LINE1 ORF1 protein		
LANCL1	LanC Like 1	LanC Like 1		
LARP1	LARP1	La-related protein 1		
LARP1B	LARP1B	La-related protein 1b		
LARP4	La-Related protein 4	La Ribonucleoprotein Domain Family Member 4		
LARP4B	LARP4B	La Ribonucleoprotein Domain Family Member 4B		
LASP1	LIM And SH3 Protein 1/MLN50	LIM And SH3 Protein 1		
LBR	LBR	Lamin-B receptor		
LEMD3	LEMD3	Inner nuclear membrane protein Man1		
LIG3	DNA Ligase 3	DNA Ligase 3		
LIN28A	LIN28A	Lin-28 Homolog A		
LIN28B	LIN28B	Lin-28 Homolog B		
LMNA	LMNA	Prelamin-A/C		
LPP	LPP	Lipoma-preferred partner		
LSM1	LSM1	LSM1 Homolog, mRNA Degradation Associated		yes
LSM12	LSM12	LSM12 Homolog		
LSM14A	RAP55	LSM14A, mRNA Processing Body Assembly Factor		yes
LSM14B	LSM14B	Protein LSM14 homolog B		yes
LSM3	LSM3	U6 snRNA-associated Sm-like protein LSm3		yes
LUC7L	LUC7L	Putative RNA-binding protein Luc7-like 1		
LUZP1	LUZP1	Leucine zipper protein 1		
MACF1	MACF1	Microtubule-actin cross-linking factor 1, isoforms 1/2/3/5		
MAEL	MAEL	Maelstrom Spermatogenic Transposon Silencer		
MAGEA4	MAGEA4	Melanoma-associated antigen 4		
MAGED1	MAGED1	Melanoma-associated antigen D1		
MAGED2	MAGED2	Melanoma-associated antigen D2		
MAGOHB	MAGOHB	Protein mago nashi homolog 2		
MAP1LC3A	LC3-I	Microtubule Associated Protein 1 Light Chain 3 Alpha		
MAP4	MAP4	Microtubule-associated protein 4		
MAPK1IP1L	MAPK1IP1L	Mitogen-Activated Protein Kinase 1 Interacting Protein 1 Like		
MAP4K4	MAP4K4	Mitogen-activated protein kinase kinase kinase kinase 4		
MAPK8	JNK1	Mitogen-Activated Protein Kinase 8		
MAPRE1	MAPRE1	Microtubule-associated protein RP/EB family member 1		
MAPRE2	MAPRE2	Microtubule Associated Protein RP/EB Family Member 2		
MARF1	MARF1	Meiosis Regulator And mRNA Stability Factor 1		yes
MARS	MARS	Methionine—tRNA ligase, cytoplasmic		
MBNL1	MBNL1	Muscleblind Like Splicing Regulator 1		
MBNL2	MBNL2	Muscleblind Like Splicing Regulator 2		
MCM4	MCM4	DNA replication licensing factor MCM4		
MCM5	MCM5	DNA replication licensing factor MCM5		
MCM7	MCM7	DNA replication licensing factor MCM7		yes
METAP1	METAP1	Methionine aminopeptidase		
METAP2	METAP2	Methionyl Aminopeptidase 2		
MCRIP1	FAM195B/GRAN2	Granulin-2		
MCRIP2	FAM195A/GRAN1	Granulin-1		
MEX3A	MEX3A	RNA-binding protein MEX3A		yes
MEX3B	MEX3B	Mex-3 RNA Binding Family Member B		
MEX3C	MEX3C	Mex-3 RNA Binding Family Member C		
MEX3D	MEX3D	Mex-3 RNA Binding Family Member D		
MFAP1	MFAP1	Microfibrillar-associated protein 1		
MKI67	MKI67	Antigen KI-67		
MKRN2	MKRN2	Makorin Ring Finger Protein 2		
MOV10	MOV-10	Mov10 RISC Complex RNA Helicase		yes
MSH6	MSH6	DNA mismatch repair protein Msh6		
MSI1	Musashi-1	Musashi RNA Binding Protein 1		yes
MSI2	MSI2	RNA-binding protein Musashi homolog 2		
MTHFD1	MTHFD1	C-1-tetrahydrofolate synthase, cytoplasmic		
MTHFSD	MTHFSD	Methenyltetrahydrofolate Synthetase Domain Containing		
MTOR	MTOR	Mechanistic Target Of Rapamycin		
MYO6	MYO6	Unconventional myosin-VI		
NCOA3	SRC-3	Nuclear Receptor Coactivator 3		
NDEL1	NUDEL/MITAP1/EOPA	NudE Neurodevelopment Protein 1 Like 1		
NELFE	NELF-E/RD	Negative Elongation Factor Complex Member E		
NEXN	NEXN	Nexilin		
NXF1	NXF1/MEX67/TAP	Nuclear RNA Export Factor 1		
NKRF	NRF	NFK-B Repressing Factor		
NOLC1	Nucleolar And Coiled-Body Phosphoprotein 1/NOPP140	Nucleolar And Coiled-Body Phosphoprotein 1		
NONO	NonO	Non-POU Domain Containing Octamer Binding		
NOP58	NOP58	Nucleolar protein 58		yes
NOSIP	NOSIP	Nitric oxide synthase-interacting protein		
NOVA2	NOVA2	NOVA Alternative Splicing Regulator 2		
NRG2	Neuregulin-2	Neuregulin-2		
NSUN2	NSUN2	tRNA (cytosine(34)-C(5))-methyltransferase		
NTMT1	NTMT1	N-terminal Xaa-Pro-Lys N-methyltransferase 1		
NUDC	NUDC	Nuclear migration protein nudC		
NUFIP1	NUFIP	NUFIP1, FMR1 Interacting Protein 1		
NUFIP2	NUFIP2	Nuclear fragile X mental retardation-interacting protein 2		
NUPL2	NUPL2	Nucleoporin Like 2		
NUP153	NUP153	Nucleoporin 153		
NUP205	NUP205	Nuclear pore complex protein Nup205		
NUP210	NUP210/GP210	Nucleoporin 210		
NUP214	NUP214	Nucleoporin 214		
NUP50	NUP50	Nucleoporin 50		
NUP58	NUP58/NUPL1	Nucleoporin 58		
NUP85	NUP85	Nucleoporin 85		
NUP88	NUP88	Nucleoporin 88		
NUP98	NUP98/NUP96	Nuclear pore complex protein Nup98-Nup96		
OASL	OASL/OASL1	2'-5'-Oligoadenylate Synthetase Like		
OAS1	OAS	2′–5′ oligoadenylate synthetase		
OAS2	OAS2	2'-5'-Oligoadenylate Synthetase 2		
OGFOD1	TPA1	2-Oxoglutarate And Iron Dependent Oxygenase Domain Containing 1		
OGG1	OGG1	8-Oxoguanine DNA Glycosylase		
OSBPL9	Oxysterol Binding Protein Like 9	Oxysterol Binding Protein Like 9		
OTUD4	OTUD4/HIN1	OTU Deubiquitinase 4		
P4HB	Prolyl 4-Hydroxylase Subunit Beta	Prolyl 4-Hydroxylase Subunit Beta		
PABPC1	PABP1	Poly(A) Binding Protein Cytoplasmic 1		
PABPC4	PABPC4	Polyadenylate-binding protein 4		
PAK4	PAK4	Serine/threonine-protein kinase PAK 4		
PALLD	Palladin	Palladin		
PARG	PARG/PARG99/PARG102	Poly(ADP-Ribose) Glycohydrolase		
PARK7	PARK7/DJ-1	Parkinsonism Associated Deglycase		yes
PARN	PARN/DAN	Poly(A)-Specific Ribonuclease		
PARP12	PARP-12/ARTD12	Poly(ADP-Ribose) Polymerase Family Member 12		
PARP14	PARP-14	Poly(ADP-Ribose) Polymerase Family Member 14		
PARP15	PARP-15	Poly(ADP-Ribose) Polymerase Family Member 15		
PATL1	PATL1	PAT1 Homolog 1, Processing Body mRNA Decay Factor		yes
PAWR	PAWR	PRKC apoptosis WT1 regulator protein		
PCBP1	PCBP1/HNRNPE1	Poly(RC) Binding Protein 1		
PCBP2	PCBP2/HNRNPE2	Poly(RC) Binding Protein 2		
PCNA	PCNA	Proliferating cell nuclear antigen		
PDAP1	PDAP1	PDGFA Associated Protein 1		
PDCD4	PDCD4	Programmed Cell Death 4		
PDCD6IP	PDCD6IP	Programmed cell death 6-interacting protein		
PDIA3	PDIA3	Protein Disulfide Isomerase Family A Member 3		
PDLIM1	PDLIM1	PDZ and LIM domain protein 1		
PDLIM4	PDLIM4	PDZ and LIM domain protein 4		
PDLIM5	PDLIM5	PDZ and LIM domain protein 5		
PDS5B	PDS5B	Sister chromatid cohesion protein PDS5 homolog B		
PEF1	PEF1	Penta-EF-Hand Domain Containing 1		
PEG10	PEG10	Paternally Expressed 10		
PELO	PELO	Protein pelota homolog		
PEPD	Peptidase D	Peptidase D		
PEX11B	PEX11B	Peroxisomal Biogenesis Factor 11 Beta		
PFDN4	PFDN4	Prefoldin subunit 4		
PFN1	Profilin 1	Profilin 1		
PFN2	Profilin 2	Profilin 2		
PGAM5	PGAM5	Serine/threonine-protein phosphatase PGAM5, mitochondrial		
PGP	PGP/G3PP	Phosphoglycolate Phosphatase		
PHB2	Prohibitin 2	Prohibitin 2		
PHLDB2	PHLDB2	Pleckstrin homology-like domain family B member 2		
PKP1	Plakophilin 1	Plakophilin 1		
PKP2	Plakophilin 2	Plakophilin 2		
PKP3	Plakophilin 3	Plakophilin 3		
PNPT1	PNPase I	Polyribonucleotide Nucleotidyltransferase 1		
POLR2B	POLR2B	DNA-directed RNA polymerase		
POM121	POM121	POM121 Transmembrane Nucleoporin		
POP7	RPP20	POP7 Homolog, Ribonuclease P/MRP Subunit		
PPME1	PPME1	Protein phosphatase methylesterase 1		
PPP1R8	PPP1R8	Protein Phosphatase 1 Regulatory Subunit 8		
PPP1R10	PPP1R10	Serine/threonine-protein phosphatase 1 regulatory subunit 10		
PPP1R18	PPP1R18	Phostensin		
PPP2R1A	PPP2R1A	Serine/threonine-protein phosphatase 2A 65 kDa regulatory subunit A alpha isoform		
PPP2R1B	PPP2R1B	Serine/threonine-protein phosphatase 2A 65 kDa regulatory subunit A beta isoform		
PQBP1	PQBP-1	Polyglutamine Binding Protein 1		
PRDX1	PRDX1	Peroxiredoxin-1		
PRDX6	PRDX6	Peroxiredoxin-6		
PRKAA2	AMPK-a2	Protein Kinase AMP-Activated Catalytic Subunit Alpha 2		
PRKCA	PKC-ɑ	Protein Kinase C Alpha		
PRKRA	PACT	Protein Activator Of Interferon Induced Protein Kinase EIF2AK2		
PRMT1	PRMT1	Protein arginine N-methyltransferase 1		
PRMT5	PRMT5	Protein arginine N-methyltransferase 5		
PRRC2A	PRRC2A	Proline Rich Coiled-Coil 2A		
PRRC2B	PRRC2B	Proline Rich Coiled-Coil 2B		
PRRC2C	PRRC2C	Proline Rich Coiled-Coil 2C		
PSMD2	PSMD2	26S proteasome non-ATPase regulatory subunit 2		
PSPC1	PSP1	Paraspeckle Component 1		
PTBP1	PTBP1	Polypyrimidine tract-binding protein 1		
PTBP3	PTBP3	Polypyrimidine tract-binding protein 3		
PTGES3	PTGES3	Prostaglandin E synthase 3		
PTK2	FAK	Protein Tyrosine Kinase 2		
PUM1	Pumilio-1	Pumilio homolog 1		yes
PUM2	Pumilio-2	Pumilio RNA Binding Family Member 2		
PURA	PURA	Transcriptional activator protein Pur-alpha		
PURB	PURB	Transcriptional activator protein Pur-beta		
PWP1	PWP1	PWP1 Homolog, Endonuclein		
PXDNL	PMR1	Peroxidasin Like		
PYCR1	PYCR1	Pyrroline-5-carboxylate reductase		
QKI	QKI/HQK	QKI, KH Domain Containing RNA Binding		
R3HDM1	R3HDM1	R3H Domain Containing 1		
R3HDM2	R3HDM2	R3H Domain Containing 2		
RAB1A	RAB1A	Ras-related protein Rab-1A		
RACGAP1	RACGAP1	Rac GTPase-activating protein 1		
RACK1	RACK1	Receptor For Activated C Kinase 1		
RAD21	RAD21	Double-strand-break repair protein rad21 homolog		
RAE1	RAE1	Ribonucleic Acid Export 1		
RAN	RAN	RAN, Member RAS Oncogene Family		
RANBP1	RANBP1	Ran-specific GTPase-activating protein		
RANBP2	RANBP2/NUP358	RAN Binding Protein 2		
RBBP4	RBBP4	Histone-binding protein RBBP4		
RBFOX1	RBFOX1	RNA binding protein fox-1 homolog		yes
RBFOX2	RBFOX2	RNA binding protein fox-1 homolog 2		
RBFOX3	RBFOX3	RNA binding protein fox-1 homolog 3		
RBM12B	RBM12B	RNA-binding protein 12B		
RBM15	RBM15	RNA-binding protein 15		
RBM17	RBM17	RNA-binding protein 17		
RBM25	RBM25	RNA-binding protein 25		
RBM26	RBM26	RNA-binding protein 26		
RBM3	RBM3	RNA-binding protein 3		
RBM38	RBM38	RNA-binding protein 38		
RBM4	RBM4	RNA Binding Motif Protein 4		
RBM4B	RBM4B	RNA Binding Motif Protein 4B		
RBM42	RBM42	RNA Binding Motif Protein 42		
RBM45	RBM45	RNA Binding Motif Protein 45		
RBM47	RBM47	RNA Binding Motif Protein 47		
RBMS1	RBMS1	RNA-binding motif, single-stranded-interacting protein 1		
RBMS2	RBMS2	RNA-binding motif, single-stranded-interacting protein 2		
RBMX	RBMX	RNA Binding Motif Protein, X-Linked		
RBPMS	RBPMS	RNA-binding protein with multiple splicing		
RC3H1	Roquin-1	Ring Finger And CCCH-Type Domains 1		
RC3H2	MNAB	Ring Finger And CCCH-Type Domains 2		
RCC1	RCC1	Regulator of chromosome condensation		
RCC2	RCC2	Protein RCC2		
RECQL	RECQL1	RecQ Like Helicase		
RFC3	RFC3	Replication factor C subunit 3		
RFC4	RFC4	Replication factor C subunit 4		
RGPD3	RGPD3	RanBP2-like and GRIP domain-containing protein 3		
RHOA	RhoA	Ras Homolog Family Member A		
RNASEL	RNAse L	Ribonuclease L		
RNF214	RNF214	RING finger protein 214		
RNF219	RNF219	RING finger protein 219		yes
RNF25	RNF25	Ring Finger Protein 25		
RNH1	RNH1	Ribonuclease inhibitor		
ROCK1	ROCK1	Rho Associated Coiled-Coil Containing Protein Kinase 1		
RPS19	Ribosomal Protein S19	Ribosomal Protein S19		
RPS3	40S Ribosomal Protein S3	40S Ribosomal Protein S3		yes
RPS6	Ribosomal Protein S6	Ribosomal Protein S6		
RPS11	Ribosomal Protein S11	Ribosomal Protein S11		
RPS24	Ribosomal Protein S24	Ribosomal Protein S24		
RPS6KA3	RSK2	Ribosomal Protein S6 Kinase A3		
RPS6KB1	S6K1	Ribosomal Protein S6 Kinase B1		
RPS6KB2	S6K2	Ribosomal Protein S6 Kinase B2		
RPTOR	RAPTOR	Regulatory Associated Protein of mTOR Complex 1		
RSL1D1	RSL1D1	Ribosomal L1 domain-containing protein 1		
RTCB	RTCB	tRNA-splicing ligase RtcB homolog, formerly C22orf28		
RTRAF	RTRAF (formerly C14orf166)	RNA Transcription, Translation And Transport Factor		
S100A7A	S100A7A	Protein S100-A7A		
S100A9	S100A9	Protein S100-A9		yes
SAFB2	SAFB2	Scaffold attachment factor B2		yes
SAMD4A	SMAUG1	Sterile Alpha Motif Domain Containing 4A		
SAMD4B	SMAUG2	Sterile Alpha Motif Domain Containing 4B		
SCAPER	SCAPER	S-Phase Cyclin A Associated Protein In The ER		
SEC24C	SEC24C	Protein transport protein Sec24C		
SECISBP2	SECIS Binding Protein 2	SECIS Binding Protein 2		
SERBP1	PAI-RBP1/SERBP1	SERPINE1 mRNA Binding Protein 1		
SERPINE1	PAI-1/Serpin E1	Serpine Family E Member 1		
SF1	SF1	Splicing Factor 1		
SFN	SFN	14-3-3 protein sigma		
SFPQ	PSF	Splicing Factor Proline And Glutamine Rich		
SFRS3	SFRS3	Serine/arginine-rich splicing factor 3		
SIPA1L1	SIPA1L1	Signal-induced proliferation-associated 1-like protein 1		
SIRT6	Sirtuin 6	Sirtuin 6		
SLBP	Stem-Loop Binding Protein	Stem-Loop Binding Protein		
SMAP2	SMAP2	Small ArfGAP2		
SMARCA1	SMARCA1/SNF2L1	Probable global transcription activator SNF2L1		
SMC4	SMC4	Structural maintenance of chromosomes protein		
SMG1	SMG-1	SMG1, Nonsense Mediated mRNA Decay Associated PI3K Related Kinase		
SMG6	SMG6	SMG6, Nonsense Mediated mRNA Decay Factor		
SMG7	SMG7	SMG7, Nonsense Mediated mRNA Decay Factor		yes
SMN1	Survival of Motor Neuron	Survival Of Motor Neuron 1, Telomeric		
SMU1	SMU1	WD40 repeat-containing protein SMU1		
SMYD5	SMYD5	SMYD Family Member 5		
SND1	Tudor-SN	Staphylococcal Nuclease And Tudor Domain Containing 1		
SNRPF	SNRPF	Small nuclear ribonucleoprotein F		
SNTB2	SNTB2	Beta-2-syntrophin		
SOGA3	SOGA3	SOGA Family Member 3		
SORBS1	SORBS1	Sorbin and SH3 domain-containing protein 1		
SORBS3	Vinexin	Sorbin And SH3 Domain Containing 3		
SOX3	SOX3	SRY-Box 3		
SPAG5	Astrin	Sperm Associated Antigen 5		
SPATS2	SPATS2/SPATA10/SCR59	Spermatogenesis Associated Serine Rich 2		
SPATS2L	SGNP	Spermatogenesis Associated Serine Rich 2 Like		
SPECC1L	SPECC1L	Cytospin-A		
SQSTM1	SQSTM1/p62	Sequestosome 1		
SRI	SRI	Sorcin		
SRP68	Signal Recognition Particle 68	Signal Recognition Particle 68		
SRP9	SRP9	Signal Recognition Particle 9		
SRRT	SRRT	Serrate RNA effector molecule homolog		
SRSF1	ASF/SF2	Serine And Arginine Rich Splicing Factor 1		
SRSF3	SRp20	Serine And Arginine Rich Splicing Factor 3		
SRSF4	SRSF4	Serine/arginine-rich splicing factor 4		
SRSF5	SRSF5/SRP40	Serine/arginine-rich splicing factor 5		
SRSF7	9G8	Serine And Arginine Rich Splicing Factor 7		
SRSF9	SRSF9/SRP30C	Serine/arginine-rich splicing factor 9		
SS18L1	SS18L1/CREST	SS18L1, nBAF Chromatin Remodeling Complex Subunit		
ST7	ST7/FAM4A1/HELG/RAY1/TSG7	Suppression Of Tumorigenicity 7		yes
STAT1	STAT1	Signal transducer and activator of transcription 1-alpha/beta		
STAU1	Staufen 1	Staufen Double-Stranded RNA Binding Protein 1		
STAU2	Staufen 2	Staufen Double-Stranded RNA Binding Protein 2		yes
STIP1	STIP1/HOP	Stress-induced-phosphoprotein 1		
STRAP	STRAP	Serine-threonine kinase receptor-associated protein		
SUGP2	SUGP2	SURP and G-patch domain-containing protein 2		
SUGT1	SUGT1	SGT1 Homolog, MIS12 Kinetochore Complex Assembly Cochaperone		
SUN1	SUN1	SUN domain-containing protein 1		
SYCP3	SYCP3	Synaptonemal complex protein 3		
SYK	SYK	Spleen Associated Tyrosine Kinase		
SYNCRIP	SYNCRIP	Heterogeneous nuclear ribonucleoprotein Q		yes
TAGLN3	Transgelin 3	Transgelin 3		
TAF15	TAF15	TATA-Box Binding Protein Associated Factor 15		
TARDBP	TDP-43	TAR DNA Binding Protein		
TBRG1	TBRG1	Transforming Growth Factor Beta Regulator 1		
TCEA1	TCEA1	Transcription elongation factor A protein 1		
TCP1	TCP1	T-complex protein 1 subunit alpha		
TDRD3	Tudor Domain Containing 3	Tudor Domain Containing 3		
TDRD7	Tudor Domain Containing 7	Tudor Domain Containing 7		
TERT	TERT	Telomerase Reverse Transcriptase		
THOC2	THOC2	THO Complex 2		
THRAP3	THRAP3	Thyroid Hormone Receptor Associated Protein 3		
TIA1	TIA-1	TIA1 Cytotoxic Granule Associated RNA Binding Protein		
TIAL1	TIAR	TIA1 Cytotoxic Granule Associated RNA Binding Protein Like 1		
TMEM131	TMEM131	Transmembrane Protein 131		yes
TMOD3	TMOD3	Tropomodulin-3		
TNKS	PARP-5a	Tankyrase		
TNKS1BP1	TNKS1BP1	182 kDa tankyrase-1-binding protein		yes
TNPO1	Transportin-1	Transportin-1/Karyopherin (Importin) Beta 2		
TNPO2	Transportin-2	Transportin-2		
TNRC6A	TNRC6A	Trinucleotide repeat-containing gene 6A protein		yes
TNRC6B	TNRC6B	Trinucleotide repeat-containing gene 6B protein		yes
TNRC6C	TNRC6C	Trinucleotide repeat-containing gene 6C protein		yes
TOMM34	TOMM34	Mitochondrial import receptor subunit TOM34		
TOP3B	Topoisomerase (DNA) III Beta	Topoisomerase (DNA) III Beta		
TPM1	TPM1	Tropomyosin alpha-1 chain		
TPM2	TPM2	Tropomyosin beta chain		
TPR	TPR	Translocated Promoter Region, Nuclear Basket Protein		
TRA2B	TRA2B	Transformer 2 Beta Homolog		
TRAF2	TRAF2	TNF Receptor Associated Factor 2		
TRDMT1	DNMT2	tRNA Aspartic Acid Methyltransferase 1		
TRIM21	TRIM21	E3 ubiquitin-protein ligase TRIM21		
TRIM25	TRIM25	E3 ubiquitin/ISG15 ligase TRIM25		
TRIM56	TRIM56	E3 ubiquitin-protein ligase TRIM56		
TRIM71	TRIM71	E3 ubiquitin-protein ligase TRIM71		
TRIP6	TRIP6	Thyroid receptor-interacting protein 6		
TROVE2	RORNP	TROVE Domain Family Member 2		
TTC17	TTC17	Tetratricopeptide Repeat Domain 17		yes
TUBA1C	TUBA1C	Tubulin alpha-1C chain		
TUBA3C	TUBA3C	Tubulin alpha-3C/D chain		
TUBA4A	TUBA4A	Tubulin alpha-4A chain		
TUBB3	TUBB3	Tubulin beta-3 chain		
TUBB8	TUBB8	Tubulin beta-8 chain		
TUFM	TUFM	Elongation factor Tu, mitochondrial		
TXN	TXN	Thioredoxin		
TXNDC17	TXNDC17	Thioredoxin Domain Containing 17		
U2AF1	U2AF1	Splicing factor U2AF 35 kDa subunit		
UBA1	UBA1	Ubiquitin-like modifier-activating enzyme 1		
UBAP2	UBAP2	Ubiquitin-associated protein 2		
UBAP2L	UBAP2L	Ubiquitin-associated protein 2-like		
UBB	Ubiquitin	Ubiquitin		
UBL5	Ubiquitin Like 5	Ubiquitin Like 5		
UBQLN2	Ubiquilin 2	Ubiquilin 2		
ULK1	ULK1	Unc-51 Like Autophagy Activating Kinase 1		
ULK2	ULK2	Unc-51 Like Autophagy Activating Kinase 2		
UPF1	UPF1	UPF1, RNA Helicase and ATPase		yes
UPF2	UPF2	UPF2, RNA Helicase and ATPase		
UPF3B	UPF3B	UPF3B, Regulator of Nonsense Mediated mRNA Decay		
USP10	USP10	Ubiquitin Specific Peptidase 10		
USP11	USP11	Ubiquitin Specific Peptidase 11		
USP13	USP13	Ubiquitin Specific Peptidase 13		
USP5	USP5	Ubiquitin carboxyl-terminal hydrolase 5		
USP9X	USP9X	Ubiquitin Specific Peptidase 9, X-Linked		
UTP18	UTP18	UTP18, Small Subunit Processome Component		
VASP	VASP	Vasodilator-stimulated phosphoprotein		
VBP1	VBP1	VHL Binding Protein 1		
VCP	VCP	Valosin Containing Protein		
WBP2	WBP2	WW Domain Binding Protein 2		
WDR47	WDR47	WD Repeat Domain 47		
WDR62	WDR62	WD Repeat Domain 62		
XPO1	XPO1/CRM1	Exportin 1		
XRN1	XRN1	5'-3' Exoribonuclease 1		yes
XRN2	XRN2	5'-3' Exoribonuclease 2		
YARS	YARS	Tyrosine—tRNA ligase, cytoplasmic		
YBX1	YB-1	Y-Box Binding Protein 1		
YBX3	YBX3/ZONAB	Y-box-binding protein 3		
YES1	YES1	Tyrosine-protein kinase Yes		
YLPM1	YLPM1	YLP Motif Containing 1		
YTHDF1	YTHDF1	YTH domain family protein 1		
YTHDF2	YTHDF2	YTH domain family protein 2		yes
YTHDF3	YTHDF3	YTH domain family protein 3		
YWHAB	14-3-3	Tyrosine 3-Monooxygenase/Tryptophan 5-Monooxygenase Activation Protein Beta		
YWHAH	14-3-3	14-3-3 protein eta		
YWHAQ	14-3-3	14-3-3 protein theta		
ZBP1	ZBP1	Z-DNA Binding Protein 1		
ZCCHC11	ZCCHC11	Zinc finger CCCH domain-containing protein 11		
ZCCHC14	ZCCHC14	Zinc finger CCCH domain-containing protein 14		
ZC3H11A	ZC3H11A	Zinc finger CCCH domain-containing protein 11a		
ZC3H14	ZC3H14	Zinc finger CCCH domain-containing protein 14		
ZCCHC2	ZCCHC2	Zinc finger CCCH domain-containing protein 2		
ZCCHC3	ZCCHC3	Zinc finger CCCH domain-containing protein 3		
ZC3H7A	ZC3H7A	Zinc finger CCCH domain-containing protein 7A		
ZC3H7B	ZC3H7B	Zinc finger CCCH domain-containing protein 7B		
ZC3HAV1	PARP-13.1/PARP-13.2/ARTD13	Zinc Finger CCCH-Type Containing, Antiviral 1		yes
ZFAND1	ZFAND1	Zinc Finger AN1-Type Containing 1		
ZFP36	TTP/TIS11	ZFP36 Ring Finger Protein/Trisetrapolin		yes
ZNF598	ZNF598	Zinc finger protein 598		
ZNF638	ZNF638	Zinc finger protein 638		
