= DHX36 =

Protein-coding gene in the species Homo sapiens

Identifiers
- Aliases: DHX36, DDX36, G4R1, MLEL1, RHAU, DEAH-box helicase 36
- External IDs: OMIM: 612767; MGI: 1919412; GeneCards: DHX36
Available structures
PDB	Ortholog search: PDBe RCSB
PDB	List of PDB id codes 2N16, 2N21
Enzyme activity
EC #	BRENDA	ExPASy	KEGG	MetaCyc
3.6.4.12	↗	↗	↗	↗
3.6.4.13	↗	↗	↗	↗

Gene location (Mouse)
Chr.	Chromosome 3 (mouse)
Band	3|3 E1	Start	62,468,013 bp
Band	3|3 E1	End	62,507,004 bp
RNA expression pattern
Bgee	Human / Mouse (ortholog); Top expressed in: sperm; lower lobe of lung; pancreatic ductal cell; caput epididymis; trigeminal ganglion; pons; external globus pallidus; corpus epididymis; superficial temporal artery; spinal ganglia / Top expressed in: ventromedial nucleus; lateral septal nucleus; Rostral migratory stream; mammillary body; lateral hypothalamus; lateral geniculate nucleus; maxillary prominence; anterior amygdaloid area; human fetus; cerebellar vermis; More reference expression data
BioGPS	n/a
Gene ontology
Molecular function	nucleotide binding; DNA binding; ATP-dependent activity, acting on DNA; helicase activity; G-quadruplex RNA binding; histone deacetylase binding; G-quadruplex DNA binding; protein binding; nucleic acid binding; double-stranded RNA binding; hydrolase activity; ATP binding; telomerase RNA binding; RNA binding; single-stranded DNA binding; magnesium ion binding; RNA polymerase II cis-regulatory region sequence-specific DNA binding; mRNA 3'-UTR binding; DNA helicase activity; 3'-5' RNA helicase activity; mRNA 3'-UTR AU-rich region binding; metal ion binding; mRNA 5'-UTR binding; pre-miRNA binding
Cellular component	chromosome; telomere; extracellular exosome; cytosol; nucleus; cytoplasm; mitochondrion; cytoplasmic stress granule; nuclear speck; axon; dendrite; cell projection; perikaryon
Biological process	RNA processing; regulation of transcription, DNA-templated; ossification; response to exogenous dsRNA; response to virus; transcription, DNA-templated; positive regulation of telomere maintenance; RNA secondary structure unwinding; positive regulation of type I interferon production; positive regulation of transcription by RNA polymerase II; telomerase RNA stabilization; immune system process; positive regulation of myeloid dendritic cell cytokine production; regulation of transcription by RNA polymerase III; regulation of translation; multicellular organism development; spermatogenesis; positive regulation of gene expression; negative regulation of translation; cell differentiation; positive regulation of mRNA 3'-end processing; DNA duplex unwinding; cellular response to heat; cellular response to UV; positive regulation of I-kappaB kinase/NF-kappaB signaling; regulation of mRNA stability; G-quadruplex DNA unwinding; innate immune response; regulation of embryonic development; defense response to virus; positive regulation of cardioblast differentiation; positive regulation of transcription initiation from RNA polymerase II promoter; positive regulation of dendritic spine morphogenesis; 3'-UTR-mediated mRNA destabilization; positive regulation of nuclear-transcribed mRNA catabolic process, deadenylation-dependent decay; positive regulation of hematopoietic progenitor cell differentiation; cellular response to arsenite ion; positive regulation of telomere maintenance via telomere lengthening; positive regulation of intracellular mRNA localization; positive regulation of cytoplasmic translation
Sources:Amigo / QuickGO
Orthologs
Databases	NCBI: entry
Species	Human	Mouse
Entrez	170506	72162
Ensembl	n/a	ENSMUSG00000027770
UniProt	Q9H2U1	Q8VHK9
RefSeq (mRNA)	NM_020865; NM_001114397	NM_028136
RefSeq (protein)	NP_001107869; NP_065916	NP_082412
Location (UCSC)	n/a	Chr 3: 62.47 – 62.51 Mb
PubMed search
- Wikidata
View/Edit Human	View/Edit Mouse

Probable ATP-dependent RNA helicase DHX36 also known as DEAH box protein 36 (DHX36) or MLE-like protein 1 (MLEL1) or G4 resolvase 1 (G4R1) or RNA helicase associated with AU-rich elements (RHAU) is an enzyme that in humans is encoded by the DHX36 gene.

== Structure ==
Structurally, DHX36 is a 1008 amino acid-long modular protein that has been crystallized in a complex with a DNA G-quadruplex. It consists of a ~440-amino acid helicase core comprising all signature motifs of the DEAH/RHA family of helicases with N- and C-terminal flanking regions of ~180 and ~380 amino acids, respectively. Part of the N-terminal flanking region forms an alpha-helix called the DHX36-specific motif, which recognizes the 5'-most G-quadruplex quartet. The OB-fold domain binds to the 3'-most G-tract sugar-phosphate backbone. Like all the DEAH/RHA helicases, the helicase associated domain is located adjacent to the helicase core region and occupies 75% of the C-terminal region.

== Function ==
DEAH/RHA proteins are RNA and DNA helicases typically characterized by low processivity translocation on substrates and the capability to bind/unwind non-canonical nucleic acid secondary structures. They are implicated in a number of cellular processes involving alteration of RNA secondary structure such as translation initiation, nuclear and mitochondrial splicing, and ribosome and spliceosome assembly. Based on their distribution patterns, some members of this DEAH/RHA protein family are believed to be involved in embryogenesis, spermatogenesis, and cellular growth and division.

DHX36 exhibits a unique ATP-dependent guanine-quadruplex (G4) resolvase activity and specificity for its substrate in vitro. DHX36 displays repetitive unwinding activity as a function of the thermal stability of the G-quadruplex substrate, characteristic of a number of other G-quadruplex resolvases such as the BLM/WRN helicases. DHX36 binds G4-nucleic acid with sub-nanomolar affinity and unwinds G4 structures much more efficiently than double-stranded nucleic acid. Consistent with these biochemical observations, DHX36 was also identified as the major source of tetramolecular RNA-resolving activity in HeLa cell lysates.

Previous work showed that DHX36 associates with mRNAs and re-localises to stress granules (SGs) upon translational arrest induced by various environmental stresses. A region of the first 105 amino acid was shown to be critical for RNA binding and re-localisation to SGs.
