= CNOT4 =

Protein-coding gene in the species Homo sapiens

Identifiers
- Aliases: CNOT4, CLONE243, NOT4, NOT4H, CCR4-NOT transcription complex subunit 4
- External IDs: OMIM: 604911; MGI: 1859026; GeneCards: CNOT4
Available structures
PDB	Ortholog search: PDBe RCSB
PDB	List of PDB id codes 1E4U, 1UR6
Enzyme activity
EC #	BRENDA	ExPASy	KEGG	MetaCyc
2.3.2.27	↗	↗	↗	↗

Gene location (Human)
Chr.	Chromosome 7 (human)
Band	7q33	Start	135,361,795 bp
Band	7q33	End	135,510,127 bp

Gene location (Mouse)
Chr.	Chromosome 6 (mouse)
Band	6|6 B1	Start	34,999,000 bp
Band	6|6 B1	End	35,110,659 bp
RNA expression pattern
Bgee	Human / Mouse (ortholog); Top expressed in: buccal mucosa cell; Achilles tendon; testicle; gastrocnemius muscle; parietal pleura; corpus callosum; internal globus pallidus; sural nerve; endothelial cell; muscle of thigh / Top expressed in: genital tubercle; Rostral migratory stream; tail of embryo; zygote; saccule; primary oocyte; secondary oocyte; otic placode; fossa; otic vesicle; More reference expression data
BioGPS	n/a
Gene ontology
Molecular function	ubiquitin-protein transferase activity; protein binding; nucleic acid binding; metal ion binding; transferase activity; RNA binding
Cellular component	cytosol; cytoplasm; CCR4-NOT complex; nucleus
Biological process	protein ubiquitination; nuclear-transcribed mRNA poly(A) tail shortening; protein autoubiquitination; DNA damage response, signal transduction by p53 class mediator resulting in cell cycle arrest; nuclear-transcribed mRNA catabolic process, deadenylation-dependent decay; ubiquitin-dependent protein catabolic process; regulation of megakaryocyte differentiation
Sources:Amigo / QuickGO
Orthologs
Databases	NCBI: entry; OMA: entry
Species	Human	Mouse
Entrez	4850	53621
Ensembl	ENSG00000080802	ENSMUSG00000038784
UniProt	O95628	Q8BT14
RefSeq (mRNA)	NM_001008225; NM_001190847; NM_001190848; NM_001190849; NM_001190850 NM_013316; NM_001393370; NM_001393371; NM_001393372; NM_001393373; NM_001393374; NM_001393375	NM_001164411; NM_001164412; NM_001164413; NM_001164414; NM_016877
RefSeq (protein)	NP_001008226; NP_001177776; NP_001177777; NP_001177778; NP_001177779 NP_037448	NP_001157883; NP_001157884; NP_001157885; NP_001157886; NP_058573
Location (UCSC)	Chr 7: 135.36 – 135.51 Mb	Chr 6: 35 – 35.11 Mb
PubMed search
- Wikidata
View/Edit Human	View/Edit Mouse

CCR4-NOT transcription complex, subunit 4 is a protein that in humans is encoded by the CNOT4 gene.

== Function ==
The protein encoded by this gene is a subunit of the CCR4-Not complex, a global transcriptional regulator and deadenylase. The encoded protein interacts with CNOT1 and has ubiquitin ligase activity. Several transcript variants encoding different isoforms have been found for this gene.[provided by RefSeq, Jul 2010]. Diseases associated with CNOT4 include Adenoiditis.
