= G3BP1 =

Protein-coding gene in the species Homo sapiens

Identifiers
- Aliases: G3BP1, G3BP, HDH-VIII, G3BP stress granule assembly factor 1
- External IDs: OMIM: 608431; MGI: 1351465; GeneCards: G3BP1
Available structures
PDB	Ortholog search: PDBe RCSB
PDB	List of PDB id codes 3Q90, 4FCJ, 4FCM, 4IIA
Enzyme activity
EC #	BRENDA	ExPASy	KEGG	MetaCyc
3.6.4.12	↗	↗	↗	↗
3.6.4.13	↗	↗	↗	↗

Gene location (Human)
Chr.	Chromosome 5 (human)
Band	5q33.1	Start	151,771,045 bp
Band	5q33.1	End	151,812,911 bp

Gene location (Mouse)
Chr.	Chromosome 11 (mouse)
Band	11|11 B1.3	Start	55,360,511 bp
Band	11|11 B1.3	End	55,395,664 bp
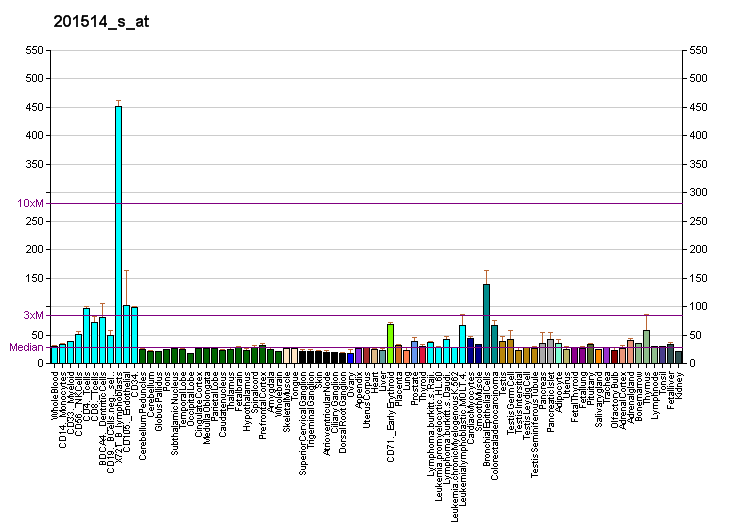

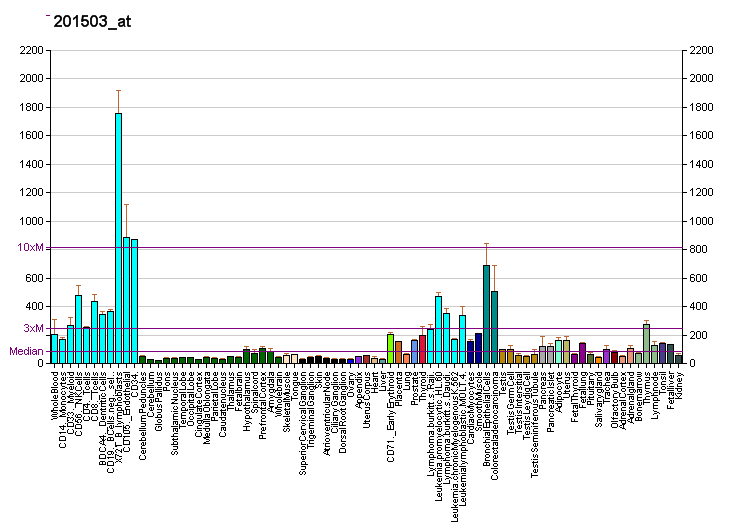
RNA expression pattern
Bgee	Human / Mouse (ortholog); Top expressed in: ventricular zone; epithelium of colon; ganglionic eminence; gonad; islet of Langerhans; stromal cell of endometrium; Achilles tendon; tonsil; muscle of thigh; gastrocnemius muscle / Top expressed in: Ileal epithelium; ventricular zone; corneal stroma; lactiferous gland; embryo; embryo; tail of embryo; plantaris muscle; epiblast; extensor digitorum longus muscle; More reference expression data
BioGPS	More reference expression data
Gene ontology
Molecular function	DNA binding; nucleotide binding; helicase activity; DNA helicase activity; protein binding; nucleic acid binding; nuclease activity; endonuclease activity; ATP binding; hydrolase activity; mRNA binding; RNA binding
Cellular component	membrane; focal adhesion; plasma membrane; intracellular anatomical structure; cytoplasmic stress granule; nucleus; cytoplasm; cytosol; perikaryon; ribonucleoprotein complex
Biological process	nucleic acid phosphodiester bond hydrolysis; Ras protein signal transduction; negative regulation of canonical Wnt signaling pathway; DNA duplex unwinding; transport; stress granule assembly
Sources:Amigo / QuickGO
Orthologs
Databases	NCBI: entry; OMA: entry
Species	Human	Mouse
Entrez	10146	27041
Ensembl	ENSG00000145907	ENSMUSG00000018583
UniProt	Q13283	P97855
RefSeq (mRNA)	NM_005754; NM_198395	NM_013716
RefSeq (protein)	NP_005745; NP_938405	NP_038744
Location (UCSC)	Chr 5: 151.77 – 151.81 Mb	Chr 11: 55.36 – 55.4 Mb
PubMed search
- Wikidata
View/Edit Human	View/Edit Mouse

3D predicted structure GTPase-activating protein-binding protein 1

Ras GTPase-activating protein-binding protein 1 is an enzyme that in humans is encoded by the G3BP1 gene.

This gene encodes one of the DNA-unwinding enzymes which prefers partially unwound 3'-tailed substrates and can also unwind partial RNA/DNA and RNA/RNA duplexes in an ATP-dependent fashion. This enzyme is a member of the heterogeneous nuclear RNA-binding proteins and is also an element of the Ras signal transduction pathway. It was originally reported to bind specifically to the Ras-GTPase-activating protein by associating with its SH3 domain, but this interaction has recently been challenged. Several alternatively spliced transcript variants of this gene have been described, but the full-length nature of some of these variants has not been determined.

G3BP1 can initiate stress granule formation and labeled G3BP1 is commonly used as a marker for stress granules.

== Structure ==
G3BP1 is composed of around 466 amino acids. The protein contains five distinct sequence regions: and N-terminal nuclear transport factor 2 (NTF2) domain, an acidic rich region, a proline-rich (PxxP) motif, an RNA recognition (RRM) motif, and an arginine-glycine (RGG) rich region

The NTF2 domain consists of three alpha helicies and five beta strands forming a beta sheet. This domain contributes to protein-protein interactions and contributes to the regulation of stress granule assembly.

The RRM region contains two sequences, RNP1 and RNP2, that contain hydrophobic amino acids that facillitate interactions with RNA.

The C-terminal RGG region is enriched with arginine and glycine and contibutes to RNA binding. Arginine residues within this region can undergo post-transciptional methylation, which has been reported to negativley regulated stress granule assembly.

== Interactions ==
G3BP1 has been shown to interact with USP10. It also interacts with SND1[5].
