= USP10 =

Protein-coding gene in humans

Identifiers
- Aliases: USP10, UBPO, ubiquitin specific peptidase 10
- External IDs: OMIM: 609818; MGI: 894652; GeneCards: USP10
Enzyme activity
EC #	BRENDA	ExPASy	KEGG	MetaCyc
3.4.19.12	↗	↗	↗	↗

Gene location (Human)
Chr.	Chromosome 16 (human)
Band	16q24.1	Start	84,699,986 bp
Band	16q24.1	End	84,779,922 bp

Gene location (Mouse)
Chr.	Chromosome 8 (mouse)
Band	8|8 E1	Start	120,637,099 bp
Band	8|8 E1	End	120,684,299 bp
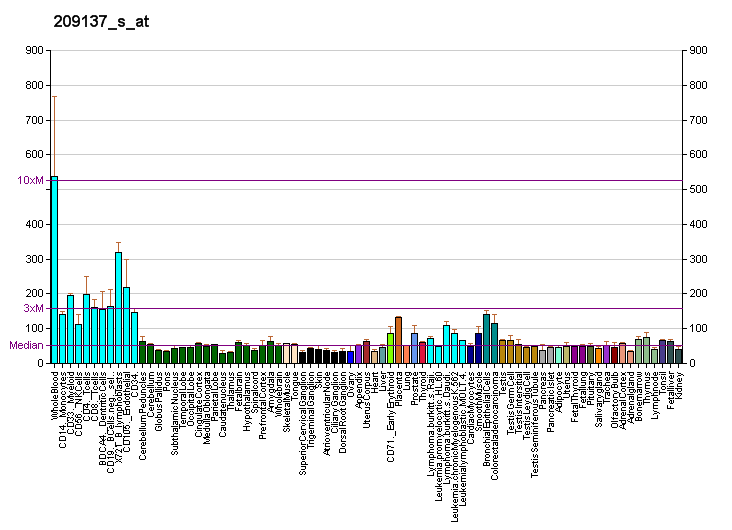

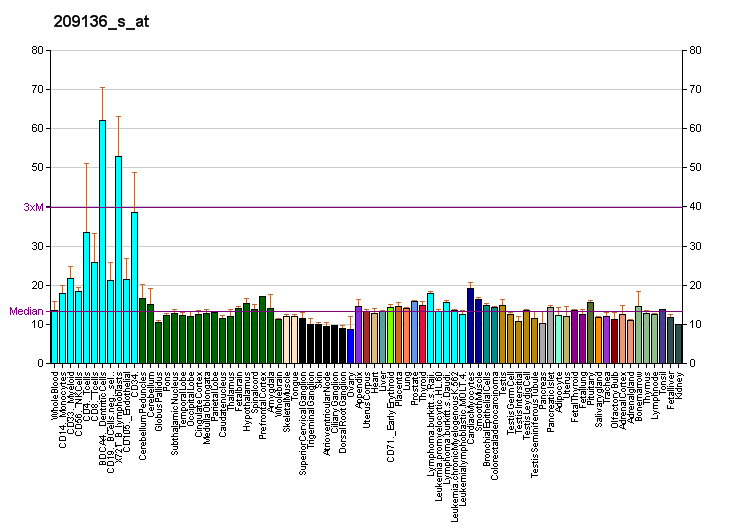
RNA expression pattern
Bgee	Human / Mouse (ortholog); Top expressed in: ventricular zone; ganglionic eminence; secondary oocyte; blood; epithelium of colon; gastrocnemius muscle; monocyte; sperm; muscle of thigh; stromal cell of endometrium / Top expressed in: tail of embryo; epiblast; genital tubercle; neural layer of retina; primitive streak; yolk sac; abdominal wall; lens; ventricular zone; morula; More reference expression data
BioGPS	More reference expression data
Gene ontology
Molecular function	cysteine-type peptidase activity; transmembrane transporter binding; p53 binding; peptidase activity; protein binding; cysteine-type endopeptidase activity; hydrolase activity; RNA binding; thiol-dependent deubiquitinase
Cellular component	cytoplasm; endosome; nucleoplasm; early endosome; nucleus; cytosol; protein-containing complex
Biological process	ubiquitin-dependent protein catabolic process; proteolysis; autophagy; regulation of autophagy; translesion synthesis; cellular response to interleukin-1; cellular response to DNA damage stimulus; negative regulation of I-kappaB kinase/NF-kappaB signaling; DNA repair; protein deubiquitination; DNA damage response, signal transduction by p53 class mediator
Sources:Amigo / QuickGO
Orthologs
Databases	NCBI: entry; OMA: entry
Species	Human	Mouse
Entrez	9100	22224
Ensembl	ENSG00000103194	ENSMUSG00000031826
UniProt	Q14694	P52479
RefSeq (mRNA)	NM_001272075; NM_005153	NM_009462; NM_001310630
RefSeq (protein)	NP_001259004; NP_005144	NP_001297559; NP_033488
Location (UCSC)	Chr 16: 84.7 – 84.78 Mb	Chr 8: 120.64 – 120.68 Mb
PubMed search
- Wikidata
View/Edit Human	View/Edit Mouse

Ubiquitin specific peptidase 10, also known as USP10, is an enzyme which in humans is encoded by the USP10 gene.

== Function ==
Ubiquitin is a highly conserved protein that is covalently linked to other proteins to regulate their function and degradation. This gene encodes a member of the ubiquitin-specific protease family of cysteine proteases. The enzyme specifically cleaves ubiquitin from ubiquitin-conjugated protein substrates. The protein is found in the nucleus and cytoplasm. It functions as a co-factor of the DNA-bound androgen receptor complex, and is inhibited by a protein in the Ras-GTPase pathway. The human genome contains several pseudogenes similar to this gene.

== Interactions ==
USP10 has been shown to interact with G3BP1. In the endothelium, USP10 regulates Notch signaling by slowing down the degradation of the intracellular domain of NOTCH1.
