= CNOT6L =

Protein-coding gene in the species Homo sapiens

Identifiers
- Aliases: CNOT6L, CCR4b, CCR4-NOT transcription complex subunit 6 like
- External IDs: OMIM: 618069; MGI: 2443154; GeneCards: CNOT6L
Available structures
PDB	Ortholog search: PDBe RCSB
PDB	List of PDB id codes 3NGN, 3NGO, 3NGQ, 5DV2
Enzyme activity
EC #	BRENDA	ExPASy	KEGG	MetaCyc
3.1.13.4	↗	↗	↗	↗

Gene location (Human)
Chr.	Chromosome 4 (human)
Band	4q21.1	Start	77,713,387 bp
Band	4q21.1	End	77,819,615 bp

Gene location (Mouse)
Chr.	Chromosome 5 (mouse)
Band	5|5 E3	Start	96,218,192 bp
Band	5|5 E3	End	96,312,030 bp
RNA expression pattern
Bgee	Human / Mouse (ortholog); Top expressed in: secondary oocyte; mucosa of ileum; superficial temporal artery; tibialis anterior muscle; bone marrow cell; thymus; corpus epididymis; tonsil; jejunal mucosa; epithelium of colon / Top expressed in: hair follicle; skin of external ear; Rostral migratory stream; secondary oocyte; primary oocyte; vas deferens; utricle; efferent ductule; blood; tibiofemoral joint; More reference expression data
BioGPS	n/a
Gene ontology
Molecular function	poly(A)-specific ribonuclease activity; metal ion binding; protein binding; nuclease activity; exonuclease activity; hydrolase activity; 3'-5'-exoribonuclease activity
Cellular component	cytoplasm; CCR4-NOT complex; nucleus; cytosol
Biological process	nuclear-transcribed mRNA poly(A) tail shortening; regulation of transcription, DNA-templated; RNA phosphodiester bond hydrolysis, exonucleolytic; mRNA processing; transcription, DNA-templated; positive regulation of cytoplasmic mRNA processing body assembly; mRNA destabilization; positive regulation of cell population proliferation; gene silencing; regulation of translation; nucleic acid phosphodiester bond hydrolysis; nuclear-transcribed mRNA catabolic process, deadenylation-dependent decay; DNA damage response, signal transduction by p53 class mediator resulting in cell cycle arrest
Sources:Amigo / QuickGO
Orthologs
Databases	NCBI: entry; OMA: entry
Species	Human	Mouse
Entrez	246175	231464
Ensembl	ENSG00000138767	ENSMUSG00000034724
UniProt	Q96LI5	Q8VEG6
RefSeq (mRNA)	NM_001286790; NM_144571; NM_001365006; NM_001365007	NM_001285511; NM_001285514; NM_144910; NM_178854
RefSeq (protein)	NP_001273719; NP_653172; NP_001351935; NP_001351936	NP_001272440; NP_001272443; NP_659159; NP_849185
Location (UCSC)	Chr 4: 77.71 – 77.82 Mb	Chr 5: 96.22 – 96.31 Mb
PubMed search
- Wikidata
View/Edit Human	View/Edit Mouse

CCR4-NOT transcription complex subunit 6 like is a protein that in humans is encoded by the CNOT6L gene. It is a paralog of CNOT6 and therefore a potential subunit of the CCR4-Not deadenylase complex.
