= RHAU =

Human RNA helicase

RHAU (RNA Helicase associated with AU-rich element (Adenine-Uracil-rich), also known as DHX36 or G4R1) is a 114-kDa human RNA helicase of the DEAH-box family of helicases encoded by the DHX36 gene.

== Structure ==
Schematic representation of RHAU protein

Structurally, RHAU is a 1008 amino acid-long modular protein. It consists of a ~440-amino acid helicase core comprising all signature motifs of the DEAH-box family of helicases with N- and C-terminal flanking regions of ~180 and ~380 amino acids, respectively. Like all the DEAH-box proteins, the helicase associated domain is located adjacent to the helicase core region and occupies 75% of the C-terminal region.

== Function ==
RHAU exhibits a unique ATP-dependent guanine-quadruplex (G4) resolvase activity and specificity for its substrate in vitro. RHAU binds G4-nucleic acid with sub-nanomolar affinity and unwinds G4 structures much more efficiently than double-stranded nucleic acid. Consistent with these biochemical observations, RHAU was also identified as the major source of tetramolecular RNA-resolving activity in HeLa cell lysates.

Previous work showed that RHAU associates with mRNAs and re-localises to stress granules (SGs) upon translational arrest induced by various environmental stresses. A region of the first 105 amino acid was shown to be critical for RNA binding and re-localisation to SGs.
