= CCR4-Not =

Multiprotein complex used in gene expression

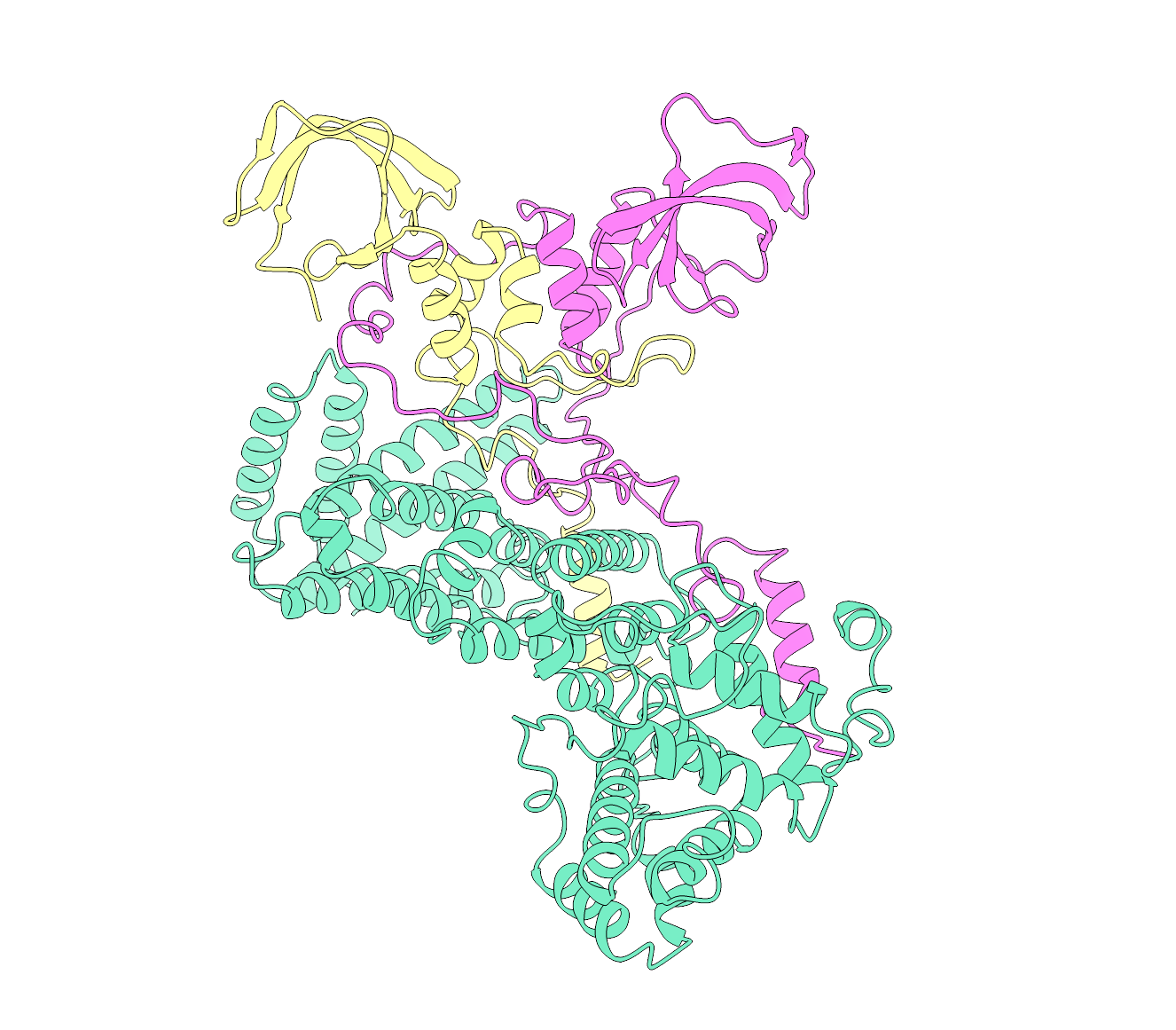
Structure of human CNOT1-CNOT2-CNOT3 module (PDB 4C0D).

Carbon Catabolite Repression 4—Negative On TATA-less, or CCR4-Not, is a multiprotein complex that functions in gene expression. The complex has multiple enzymatic activities as both a poly(A) 3′-5′ exonuclease and a ubiquitin ligase. The exonuclease activity of CCR4-Not shortens the poly(A) tail found at 3' end of almost every eukaryotic mRNA. The complex is present both in the nucleus where it regulates transcription and in the cytoplasm where it associates with translating ribosomes and RNA processing bodies. In mammalian cell, it has a function in the regulation of the cell cycle, chromatin modification, activation and inhibition of transcription initiation, control of transcription elongation, RNA export, nuclear RNA surveillance, and DNA damage repair in nucleus. Ccr4–Not complex plays an important role in mRNA decay and protein quality control in the cytoplasm.

== Subunits ==
The human CCR4-Not complex is composed of structural (non-catalytic) subunits and those that have exonuclease and E3 ligase activity. Some but not all of the human subunits are conserved in budding yeast. In yeast the complex has nine core subunits, comprising Ccr4 (carbon catabolite repression), Caf proteins (Ccr4 associated factor) (Caf1, Caf40, Caf130) and Not proteins (Not1, Not2, Not3, Not4, and Not5).

Subunit	MW (kDa)^{[A]}	Key Features
CNOT1	267	"Scaffold" with non-catalytic function. Linked to the maintenance of embryonic stem cells.
CNOT2	60	Structural component. Linked to the maintenance of embryonic stem cells.
CNOT3	82	Structural component. Linked to the maintenance of embryonic stem cells.
CNOT4	64	Active as E3 ubiquitin ligase.
CNOT6	63	3′-5′ exonuclease with preference for polyadenylated mRNA substates. Has a human paralog CNOT6L.
CNOT7	33	3′-5′ exonuclease that is partially redundant with CNOT8.
CNOT8	34	3′-5′ exonuclease.
CNOT9	34	Serves a non-catalytic function.
CNOT10	82	Non-catalytic subunit that forms a module with CNOT11 that is absent in fungi.
CNOT11	55	Non-catalytic subunit that forms a module with CNOT10 that is absent in fungi.

^{A} Molecular weight of human subunits from Uniprot.

== See also ==
- Deadenylation
- Gene expression
