= CNOT9 =

Protein-coding gene in humans

Identifiers
- Aliases: CNOT9, CT129, RCD-1, RCD1, CAF40, RQCD1, CCR4-NOT transcription complex subunit 9
- External IDs: OMIM: 612054; MGI: 1928902; GeneCards: CNOT9
Available structures
| PDB | Ortholog search: PDBe RCSB |
| PDB | List of PDB id codes 2FV2, 4CRU, 4CRV, 4CT6, 4CT7 |

Gene location (Human)
| Chr. | Chromosome 2 (human) |
| Band | 2q35 | Start | 218,568,580 bp |
| Band | 2q35 | End | 218,597,080 bp |

Gene location (Mouse)
| Chr. | Chromosome 1 (mouse) |
| Band | 1|1 C4 | Start | 74,545,217 bp |
| Band | 1|1 C4 | End | 74,570,001 bp |
RNA expression pattern
| Bgee | Human / Mouse (ortholog); Top expressed in: gingival epithelium; epithelium of nasopharynx; ganglionic eminence; right uterine tube; lymph node; stromal cell of endometrium; gastric mucosa; Achilles tendon; anterior pituitary; rectum / Top expressed in: tail of embryo; genital tubercle; yolk sac; epiblast; somite; ventricular zone; maxillary prominence; zygote; mandibular prominence; fetal liver hematopoietic progenitor cell; More reference expression data |
| BioGPS | n/a |
Gene ontology
| Molecular function | protein homodimerization activity; protein domain specific binding; protein binding; epidermal growth factor receptor binding; kinase binding |
| Cellular component | cytoplasm; cytosol; membrane; CCR4-NOT complex; P-body; CCR4-NOT core complex; nucleus; protein-containing complex |
| Biological process | nuclear-transcribed mRNA poly(A) tail shortening; negative regulation of translation; regulation of transcription, DNA-templated; mRNA catabolic process; cytokine-mediated signaling pathway; sex differentiation; transcription, DNA-templated; gene silencing; negative regulation of intracellular estrogen receptor signaling pathway; regulation of translation; DNA damage response, signal transduction by p53 class mediator resulting in cell cycle arrest; nuclear-transcribed mRNA catabolic process, deadenylation-dependent decay; positive regulation of peptidyl-serine phosphorylation; positive regulation of epidermal growth factor receptor signaling pathway |
Sources:Amigo / QuickGO
Orthologs
| Databases | NCBI: entry; OMA: entry |
| Species | Human | Mouse |
| Entrez | 9125 | 58184 |
| Ensembl | ENSG00000144580 | ENSMUSG00000026174 |
| UniProt | Q92600 | Q9JKY0 |
| RefSeq (mRNA) | NM_001271634; NM_001271635; NM_005444 | NM_021383 |
| RefSeq (protein) | NP_001258563; NP_001258564; NP_005435 | NP_067358 |
| Location (UCSC) | Chr 2: 218.57 – 218.6 Mb | Chr 1: 74.55 – 74.57 Mb |
| PubMed search |
- Wikidata
| View/Edit Human | View/Edit Mouse |

CCR4-NOT transcription complex subunit 9 is a protein that in humans is encoded by the CNOT9 gene.

== Function ==
This gene encodes a member of the highly conserved RCD1 protein family. The encoded protein is a transcriptional cofactor and a core protein of the CCR4-Not deadenylation complex. It may be involved in signal transduction as well as retinoic acid-regulated cell differentiation and development. Alternatively spliced transcript variants have been described for this gene. [provided by RefSeq, Oct 2012].
