= CCDC9B =

Identifiers
- Aliases: CCDC9B, chromosome 15 open reading frame 52, C15orf52, coiled-coil domain containing 9B
- External IDs: MGI: 2685199; GeneCards: CCDC9B

Gene location (Human)
Chr.	Chromosome 15 (human)
Band	15q15.1	Start	40,331,452 bp
Band	15q15.1	End	40,340,939 bp

Gene location (Mouse)
Chr.	Chromosome 2 (mouse)
Band	2|2 E5	Start	118,584,639 bp
Band	2|2 E5	End	118,593,142 bp
RNA expression pattern
Bgee	Human / Mouse (ortholog); Top expressed in: apex of heart; muscle layer of sigmoid colon; right lobe of thyroid gland; left lobe of thyroid gland; gastrocnemius muscle; gastric mucosa; skeletal muscle tissue; left ventricle; sural nerve; muscle of thigh / Top expressed in: muscle of thigh; esophagus; skeletal muscle tissue; white adipose tissue; urinary bladder; lens; islet of Langerhans; quadriceps femoris muscle; lung; zone of skin; More reference expression data
BioGPS	n/a
Orthologs
Databases	NCBI: entry; OMA: entry
Species	Human	Mouse
Entrez	388115	214239
Ensembl	ENSG00000188549	ENSMUSG00000045838
UniProt	Q6ZUT6	A3KGF9
RefSeq (mRNA)	NM_207380	NM_001001982
RefSeq (protein)	NP_997263	NP_001001982
Location (UCSC)	Chr 15: 40.33 – 40.34 Mb	Chr 2: 118.58 – 118.59 Mb
PubMed search
- Wikidata
View/Edit Human	View/Edit Mouse

Coiled-Coil Domain Containing 9B is a human protein encoded by the gene CCDC9B (previously C15orf52). Its function is poorly understood.

== Gene ==
CCDC9B is a gene located on the reverse strand of chromosome 15 in the species Homo sapiens at locus 15q15.1. The gene is 9,516 base pairs long including introns and exons. The gene contains 12 distinct introns, 11 exons, produces 7 different mRNAs, and 6 alternatively spliced variants.

=== Promoter ===
The promoter region upstream of the gene contains several transcription factors that regulate the expression of the CCDC9B gene.

== mRNA ==
The linear mRNA is 5344 base pairs long. The mRNA contains a short 5' untranslated region of 15 base pairs and a long 3' untranslated region of 3782 base pairs. In the long 3' untranslated region, three specific miRNA binding sites were found for has-miR-147b, hsa-miR-203a-3p.1, and has-miR-214-5p miRNAs.

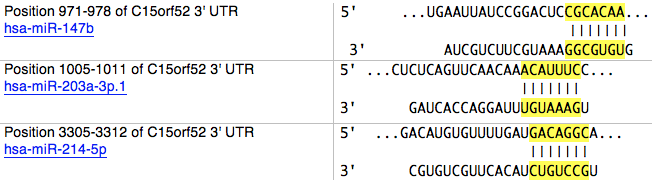
Specific nucleotide binding sites for known miRNAs in 3' UTR of CCDC9B mRNA conserved among vertebrates.

== Protein ==
=== General properties ===
The protein contains a domain of unknown function (DUF4594 from amino acid 185 to 350). The protein, CCDC9B, is a 534 amino acid long protein weighing 57.325 kDa found in Homo sapiens.

=== Structure ===
==== Primary ====
Comparison of the amino acid composition to "Homo sapiens" revealed certain amino acids with differing frequencies than other proteins in humans. Phenylalanine, Tyrosine, and Asparagine were all found in lower frequencies than other proteins in humans. Glycine and Arginine were found at higher frequencies than other proteins in humans. The isoelectric point of the protein is 9.457, indicating a basic protein at a normal physiological pH of 7.4.

==== Secondary ====
CCDC9B has a coiled coil domain spanning amino acids 60-97 containing alpha helices.

==== Tertiary ====
The tertiary structure of this protein is still unknown to the scientific community.

=== Subcellular localization ===
There are no transmembrane sequences detected in the CCDC9B protein. CCDC9B is also predicted to be a non-cytoplasmic soluble protein likely to be found as a nuclear protein.

=== Post-translational modifications ===
The protein has been experimentally observed with phosphorylation at serines found at two locations, S201 and S392. N-terminal acetylations, C-glycosylations, glycations, leucine rich nuclear export signals, sumoylation, and PEST motifs were all predicted across orthologs for this protein.

== Interacting proteins ==
Two proteins, THO complex subunit 1 (THOC1) and THO complex subunit 7 (THOC7) were found to interact with CCDC9B using anti-tag coimmunoprecipitation. THOC1 is a component of the THO subcomplex of the TREX complex that is thought to couple mRNA transcription, processing and nuclear export. It is also involved in an apoptotic pathway characterized by activation of caspase-6. THOC7 is also part of the same subcomplex and is required for efficient export of polyadenylated RNA. Ring finger protein 2 (RNF2) and SUZ12 polycomb repressive complex 2 subunit (SUZ12) were also indicated as interacting proteins. RNF2 is part of a polycomb group of proteins that are important for transcription repression of various genes. It also possess ubiquitin ligase activity. SUZ12 is also a polycomb group protein and part of a complex that methylates lysines of histones and also is involved with repression of genes.

== Homology ==
=== Paralogs ===
There are no known complete paralogs for the CCDC9B protein. There is a homologous domain found in Coiled Coil Domain Containing Protein 9 (CCDC9) that is paralogous to the CCDC9B protein from amino acid 9 to 55 of CCDC9. This domain is found in primates to mollusks. This CCDC9 domain is not found in any unicellular organisms or multicellular organisms more distant than mollusks.

=== Orthologs ===
Orthologs of the CCDC9B protein were traced back to cartilaginous fishes. None were found in any multicellular organisms more distant than cartilaginous fishes or unicellular organisms.

Common name	Genus & Species	Date of Divergence from Humans (MYA)	Accession number	Sequence length	Sequence identity to Humans ! !Sequence similarity to Humans	
Human	Homo sapiens	0	NP_997263.2	534	100%	100%
Brandt's bat	Myotis brandtii	97.5	XP_005860303.2	564	76%	79%
Cattle	Bos taurus	97.5	XP_015328613.1	577	75%	77%
Mouflon	Ovis musimon	97.5	XP_014962253.1	513	69%	74%
House mouse	Mus musculus	90.5	NP_001001982.2	545	63%	71%
Gekko	Gekko japonicus	320.5	XP_015282702.1	591	41%	55%
Zebra finch	Taeniopygia guttata	320.5	XP_012429790.1	625	41%	57%
Carolina anole	Anolis carolinensis	320.5	XP_008115041.1	496	39%	55%
Green sea turtle	Chelonia mydas	320.5	XP_007069465.1	743	39%	57%
Chicken	Gallus gallus	320.5	XP_004941352.2	637	38%	54%
Golden eagle	Aquila chrysaetos canadensis	320.5	XP_011595804.1	647	38%	53%
Western clawed frog	Xenopus tropicalis	355.7	XP_004917355.1	507	37%	54%
Common garter snake	Thamnophis sirtalis	320.5	XP_013925154.1	586	37%	52%
Mexican tetra	Astyanax mexicanus	429.6	XP_007230442.1	354	37%	52%
Spotted gar	Lepisosteus oculatus	429.6	XP_015206400.1	674	37%	52%
Common starling	Sturnus vulgaris	320.5	XP_014734365.1	646	37%	53%
Chinese alligator	Alligator sinensis	320.5	XP_014372849.1	504	37%	54%
Burmese python	Python bivittatus	320.5	XP_007429068.1	587	37%	53%
Zebra fish	Danio rerio	429.6	XP_001337385.3	516	32%	51%
Australian ghostshark	Callorhinchus milii	482.9	XP_007891400.1	692	29%	45%
Pufferfish	Takifugu rubripes	429.6	XP_011614636.1	525	35%	51%

=== Divergence ===
A comparison of the corrected distances of CCDC9B with the rapidly mutating Fibrinogen Alpha protein and the slowly mutating Cytochrome C protein is shown below. The paralogous domain in CCDC9 is also shown below. Overall, CCDC9B changes fairly rapidly as a whole, however the paralogous domain does not.

== Expression ==
Origin of cDNAs of CCDC9B shows that the gene is expressed in numerous locations such as primary and secondary digestive organs (pancreas, stomach, liver, etc.), nervous system (brain, retina, lens), skin, reproductive organs, bones, and many other tissues suggesting a fairly nonspecialized function. However, CCDC9B protein is relatively over-expressed in the colon, peripheral blood mononuclear cells, testis, and rectum. Application of RNA-seq to plasma extracellular RNA profiles indicated CCDC9B as the most abundant mRNA present, possibly indicating some role outside of the cell. In mice, the expression pattern of CCDC9B, as well as TCEA3 and FHOD3, two other genes studied, was found to be similar to that of well-characterized genes known to be associated with heart development such as BVES and CXCL12. However CCDC9B was not detected before embryological day 9.5 in the tail area and its exact function is not yet known.

== Clinical significance ==
Diseases associated with CCDC9B include colorectal cancer where the protein was over-expressed in tumor cells.
