= CNOT2 =

Protein-coding gene in humans

Identifiers
- Aliases: CNOT2, CDC36, NOT2, NOT2H, HSPC131, CCR4-NOT transcription complex subunit 2, IDNADFS
- External IDs: OMIM: 604909; MGI: 1919318; GeneCards: CNOT2
Available structures
PDB	Ortholog search: PDBe RCSB
PDB	List of PDB id codes 4C0D, 4C0F, 5FU6, 5FU7

Gene location (Human)
Chr.	Chromosome 12 (human)
Band	12q15	Start	70,243,002 bp
Band	12q15	End	70,354,993 bp

Gene location (Mouse)
Chr.	Chromosome 10 (mouse)
Band	10|10 D2	Start	116,321,066 bp
Band	10|10 D2	End	116,417,416 bp
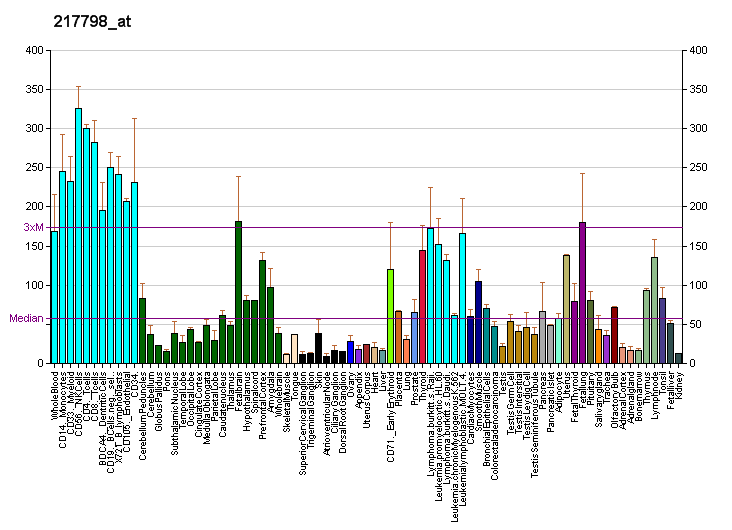
RNA expression pattern
Bgee	Human / Mouse (ortholog); Top expressed in: oocyte; secondary oocyte; Achilles tendon; nipple; epithelium of nasopharynx; human penis; epithelium of colon; ganglionic eminence; skin of abdomen; cerebellar cortex / Top expressed in: genital tubercle; ciliary body; internal carotid artery; external carotid artery; medullary collecting duct; iris; tail of embryo; primitive streak; retinal pigment epithelium; cumulus cell; More reference expression data
BioGPS	More reference expression data
Gene ontology
Molecular function	poly(A)-specific ribonuclease activity; transcription coregulator activity; protein binding
Cellular component	cytoplasm; membrane; CCR4-NOT complex; P-body; CCR4-NOT core complex; nucleus; cytosol; plasma membrane
Biological process	nuclear-transcribed mRNA poly(A) tail shortening; negative regulation of translation; regulation of transcription, DNA-templated; regulation of transcription by RNA polymerase II; regulation of stem cell population maintenance; negative regulation of transcription by RNA polymerase II; transcription, DNA-templated; multicellular organism development; positive regulation of cytoplasmic mRNA processing body assembly; trophectodermal cell differentiation; gene silencing; negative regulation of intracellular estrogen receptor signaling pathway; regulation of translation; nuclear-transcribed mRNA catabolic process, deadenylation-dependent decay; DNA damage response, signal transduction by p53 class mediator resulting in cell cycle arrest; RNA phosphodiester bond hydrolysis, exonucleolytic
Sources:Amigo / QuickGO
Orthologs
Databases	NCBI: entry; OMA: entry
Species	Human	Mouse
Entrez	4848	72068
Ensembl	ENSG00000111596	ENSMUSG00000020166
UniProt	Q9NZN8	Q8C5L3
RefSeq (mRNA)	NM_001199302; NM_001199303; NM_014515	NM_001037846; NM_001037847; NM_001037848; NM_028082; NM_001359247 NM_001359248; NM_001359249; NM_001359250; NM_001359251; NM_001359252; NM_001359253; NM_001359563
RefSeq (protein)	NP_001186231; NP_001186232; NP_055330	NP_001032935; NP_001032936; NP_001032937; NP_082358; NP_001346176 NP_001346177; NP_001346178; NP_001346179; NP_001346180; NP_001346181; NP_001346182; NP_001346492
Location (UCSC)	Chr 12: 70.24 – 70.35 Mb	Chr 10: 116.32 – 116.42 Mb
PubMed search
- Wikidata
View/Edit Human	View/Edit Mouse

CCR4-NOT transcription complex subunit 2 is a protein that in humans is encoded by the CNOT2 gene. It is a subunit of the CCR4-Not deadenylase complex.
