= CNOT8 =

Protein-coding gene in the species Homo sapiens

Identifiers
- Aliases: CNOT8, CAF1, CALIF, Caf1b, POP2, hCAF1, CCR4-NOT transcription complex subunit 8
- External IDs: OMIM: 603731; MGI: 1916375; GeneCards: CNOT8
Enzyme activity
EC #	BRENDA	ExPASy	KEGG	MetaCyc
3.1.13.4	↗	↗	↗	↗

Gene location (Human)
Chr.	Chromosome 5 (human)
Band	5q33.2	Start	154,857,553 bp
Band	5q33.2	End	154,876,792 bp

Gene location (Mouse)
Chr.	Chromosome 11 (mouse)
Band	11|11 B1.3	Start	57,994,979 bp
Band	11|11 B1.3	End	58,009,420 bp
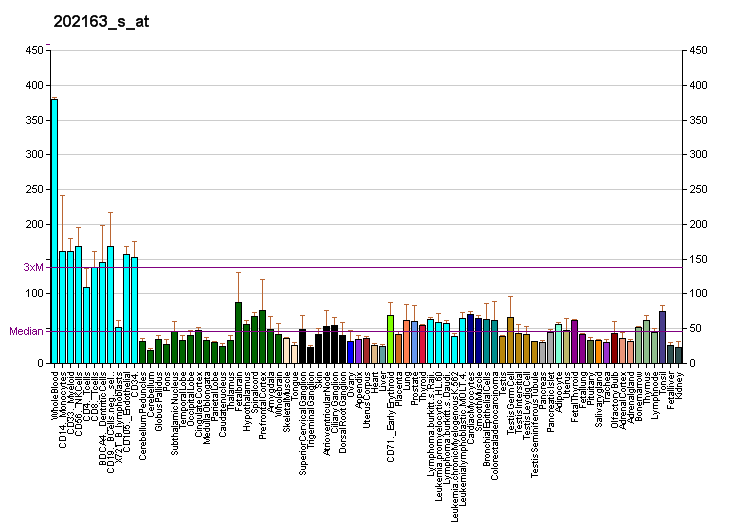

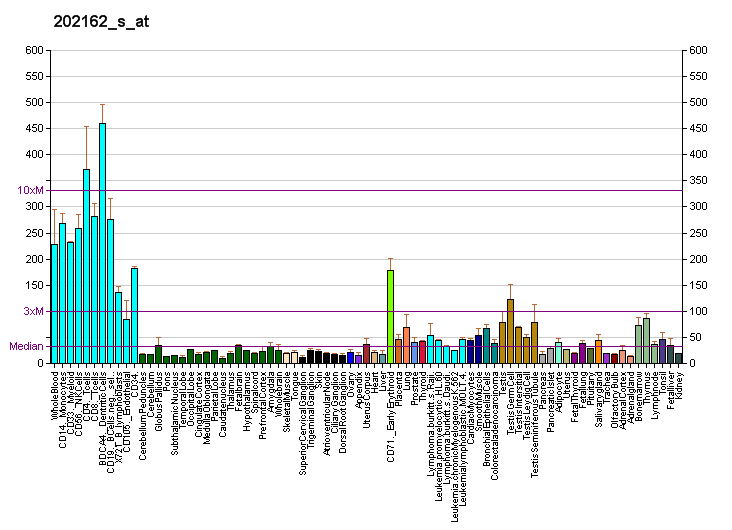

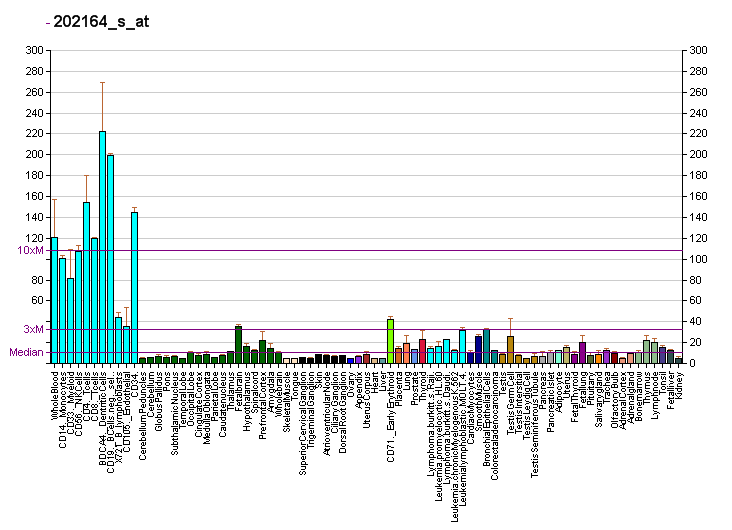
RNA expression pattern
Bgee	Human / Mouse (ortholog); Top expressed in: secondary oocyte; monocyte; sperm; right lung; ganglionic eminence; Achilles tendon; granulocyte; rectum; upper lobe of left lung; ventricular zone / Top expressed in: secondary oocyte; neural layer of retina; thymus; zygote; medial ganglionic eminence; granulocyte; ventricular zone; primary oocyte; neural tube; morula; More reference expression data
BioGPS	More reference expression data
Gene ontology
Molecular function	poly(A)-specific ribonuclease activity; 3'-5'-exoribonuclease activity; DNA-binding transcription factor activity; metal ion binding; protein binding; RNA binding; nucleic acid binding; nuclease activity; exonuclease activity; hydrolase activity
Cellular component	cytoplasm; cytosol; CCR4-NOT complex; intracellular anatomical structure; nucleus; P-body; CCR4-NOT core complex
Biological process	regulation of transcription, DNA-templated; nucleic acid phosphodiester bond hydrolysis; positive regulation of mRNA catabolic process; transcription, DNA-templated; gene silencing by miRNA; positive regulation of cell population proliferation; exonucleolytic catabolism of deadenylated mRNA; gene silencing; regulation of translation; negative regulation of cell population proliferation; DNA damage response, signal transduction by p53 class mediator resulting in cell cycle arrest; RNA phosphodiester bond hydrolysis, exonucleolytic; nuclear-transcribed mRNA poly(A) tail shortening; negative regulation of translation
Sources:Amigo / QuickGO
Orthologs
Databases	NCBI: entry; OMA: entry
Species	Human	Mouse
Entrez	9337	69125
Ensembl	ENSG00000155508	ENSMUSG00000020515
UniProt	Q9UFF9	Q9D8X5
RefSeq (mRNA)	NM_001301073; NM_001301074; NM_001301075; NM_001301077; NM_001301080 NM_001301082; NM_001301083; NM_001301086; NM_004779	NM_026949; NM_001356477; NM_001363084; NM_001363085; NM_001363086
RefSeq (protein)	NP_001288002; NP_001288003; NP_001288004; NP_001288006; NP_001288009 NP_001288011; NP_001288012; NP_001288015; NP_004770	NP_081225; NP_001343406; NP_001350013; NP_001350014; NP_001350015
Location (UCSC)	Chr 5: 154.86 – 154.88 Mb	Chr 11: 57.99 – 58.01 Mb
PubMed search
- Wikidata
View/Edit Human	View/Edit Mouse

CCR4-NOT transcription complex subunit 8 is a protein that in humans is encoded by the CNOT8 gene. It is a subunit of the CCR4-Not deadenylase complex.

== Interactions ==
CNOT8 has been shown to interact with BTG2, BTG1, CNOT1 and CNOT3.
