= Coiled-coil domain containing 124 =

Protein found in humans

CCDC124

Identifiers
- Aliases: CCDC124, coiled-coil domain containing 124, oxs1, Lso2
- External IDs: MGI: 1916403; GeneCards: CCDC124

Gene location (Mouse)
Chr.	Chromosome 8 (mouse)
Band	8|8 B3.3	Start	71,320,871 bp
Band	8|8 B3.3	End	71,326,579 bp
RNA expression pattern
Bgee	Human / Mouse (ortholog); Top expressed in: cingulate gyrus; gastrocnemius muscle; Brodmann area 9; left coronary artery; prefrontal cortex; popliteal artery; ascending aorta; amygdala; right coronary artery; hypothalamus / Top expressed in: otic vesicle; interventricular septum; yolk sac; facial motor nucleus; embryo; muscle of thigh; neural tube; embryo; hand; neural layer of retina; More reference expression data
BioGPS	n/a
Gene ontology
Molecular function	RNA binding
Cellular component	midbody; microtubule organizing center; cytoskeleton; cytoplasm; cytosol; plasma membrane
Biological process	cell division; cell cycle
Sources:Amigo / QuickGO
Orthologs
Databases	NCBI: entry
Species	Human	Mouse
Entrez	115098	234388
Ensembl	n/a	ENSMUSG00000007721
UniProt	Q96CT7	Q9D8X2
RefSeq (mRNA)	NM_138442; NM_001136203	NM_026964
RefSeq (protein)	NP_001129675; NP_612451	NP_081240
Location (UCSC)	n/a	Chr 8: 71.32 – 71.33 Mb
PubMed search
- Wikidata
View/Edit Human	View/Edit Mouse

Coiled-coil domain containing 124 is a protein that in humans is encoded by the CCDC124 gene.
