= CNOT3 =

Protein-coding gene in the species Homo sapiens

Identifiers
- Aliases: CNOT3, LENG2, NOT3, NOT3H, CCR4-NOT transcription complex subunit 3, IDDSADF
- External IDs: OMIM: 604910; MGI: 2385261; GeneCards: CNOT3
Available structures
PDB	Ortholog search: PDBe RCSB
PDB	List of PDB id codes 4C0D, 4C0G, 5FU6, 5FU7

Gene location (Human)
Chr.	Chromosome 19 (human)
Band	19q13.42	Start	54,137,749 bp
Band	19q13.42	End	54,155,681 bp

Gene location (Mouse)
Chr.	Chromosome 7 (mouse)
Band	7|7 A1	Start	3,645,268 bp
Band	7|7 A1	End	3,661,109 bp
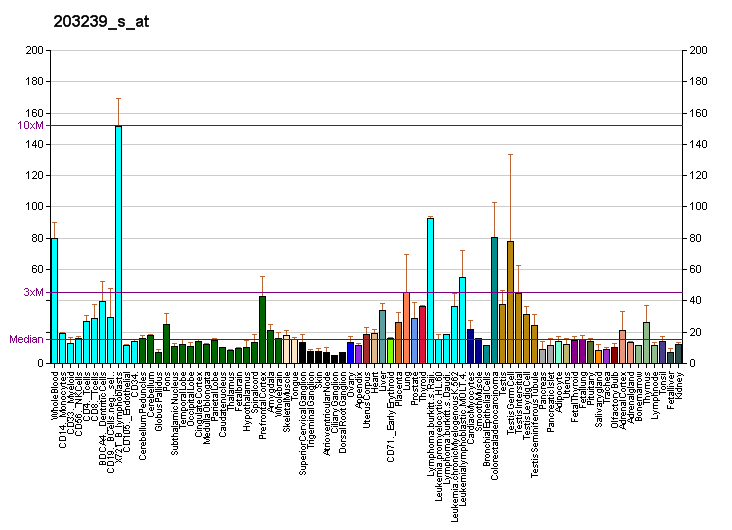

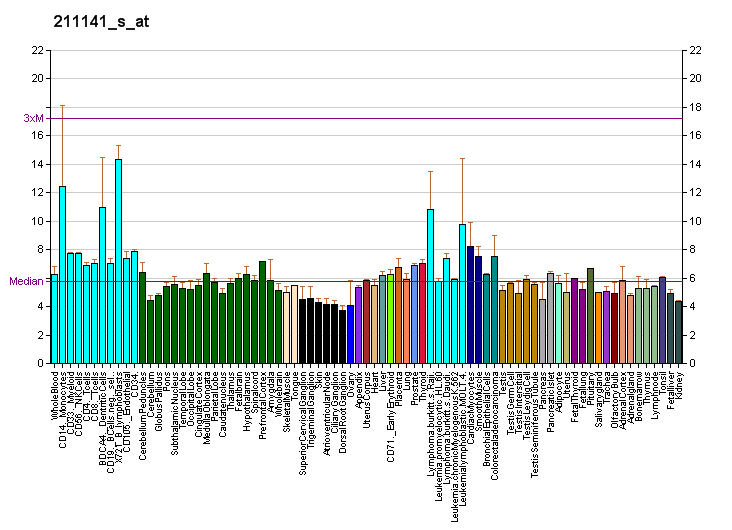
RNA expression pattern
Bgee	Human / Mouse (ortholog); Top expressed in: sural nerve; pituitary gland; granulocyte; right uterine tube; anterior pituitary; right hemisphere of cerebellum; ventricular zone; left lobe of thyroid gland; right lobe of thyroid gland; blood / Top expressed in: zygote; genital tubercle; tail of embryo; granulocyte; ventricular zone; yolk sac; neural layer of retina; lip; hand; Rostral migratory stream; More reference expression data
BioGPS	More reference expression data
Gene ontology
Molecular function	protein binding
Cellular component	cytoplasm; CCR4-NOT complex; cytosol; P-body; nucleus; CCR4-NOT core complex
Biological process	nuclear-transcribed mRNA poly(A) tail shortening; multicellular organism development; gene silencing; negative regulation of translation; regulation of stem cell population maintenance; regulation of transcription, DNA-templated; trophectodermal cell differentiation; regulation of translation; transcription, DNA-templated; DNA damage response, signal transduction by p53 class mediator resulting in cell cycle arrest; nuclear-transcribed mRNA catabolic process, deadenylation-dependent decay; positive regulation of cold-induced thermogenesis
Sources:Amigo / QuickGO
Orthologs
Databases	NCBI: entry; OMA: entry
Species	Human	Mouse
Entrez	4849	232791
Ensembl	ENSG00000088038; ENSG00000277600; ENSG00000277114; ENSG00000274616; ENSG00000275979 ENSG00000277615; ENSG00000276082; ENSG00000274176; ENSG00000274941; ENSG00000273943	ENSMUSG00000035632
UniProt	O75175	Q8K0V4
RefSeq (mRNA)	NM_014516	NM_146176
RefSeq (protein)	NP_055331	NP_666288
Location (UCSC)	Chr 19: 54.14 – 54.16 Mb	Chr 7: 3.65 – 3.66 Mb
PubMed search
- Wikidata
View/Edit Human	View/Edit Mouse

CCR4-NOT transcription complex subunit 3 is a protein that in humans is encoded by the CNOT3 gene. It is a subunit of the CCR4-Not deadenylase complex.

== Interactions ==
CNOT3 has been shown to interact with CNOT8.
