= CNOT10 =

Protein-coding gene in the species Homo sapiens

Identifiers
- Aliases: CNOT10, CCR4-NOT transcription complex subunit 10
- External IDs: MGI: 1926143; GeneCards: CNOT10

Gene location (Human)
Chr.	Chromosome 3 (human)
Band	3p22.3	Start	32,685,145 bp
Band	3p22.3	End	32,773,875 bp

Gene location (Mouse)
Chr.	Chromosome 9 (mouse)
Band	9|9 F3	Start	114,585,878 bp
Band	9|9 F3	End	114,640,184 bp
RNA expression pattern
Bgee	Human / Mouse (ortholog); Top expressed in: right testis; left testis; testicle; right uterine tube; gonad; ventricular zone; anterior pituitary; epithelium of colon; ganglionic eminence; mucosa of transverse colon / Top expressed in: otic vesicle; spermatocyte; spermatid; hand; medullary collecting duct; neural layer of retina; otolith organ; utricle; ventricular zone; epiblast; More reference expression data
BioGPS	n/a
Gene ontology
Molecular function	protein binding
Cellular component	cytoplasm; CCR4-NOT complex; cytosol; membrane; nucleus
Biological process	nuclear-transcribed mRNA poly(A) tail shortening; gene silencing; regulation of transcription, DNA-templated; regulation of translation; transcription, DNA-templated; DNA damage response, signal transduction by p53 class mediator resulting in cell cycle arrest; mRNA catabolic process; negative regulation of translation
Sources:Amigo / QuickGO
Orthologs
Databases	NCBI: entry; OMA: entry
Species	Human	Mouse
Entrez	25904	78893
Ensembl	ENSG00000182973	ENSMUSG00000056167
UniProt	Q9H9A5	Q8BH15
RefSeq (mRNA)	NM_001256741; NM_001256742; NM_015442; NM_001393366; NM_001393367 NM_001393368; NM_001393369	NM_153585
RefSeq (protein)	NP_001243670; NP_001243671; NP_056257	NP_705813
Location (UCSC)	Chr 3: 32.69 – 32.77 Mb	Chr 9: 114.59 – 114.64 Mb
PubMed search
- Wikidata
View/Edit Human	View/Edit Mouse

CCR4-NOT transcription complex subunit 10 is a protein that in humans is encoded by the CNOT10 gene. It is a subunit of the CCR4-Not deadenylase complex.
