= CNOT11 =

Protein-coding gene in humans

Identifiers
- Aliases: CNOT11, C2orf29, C40, CCR4-NOT transcription complex subunit 11
- External IDs: MGI: 106580; GeneCards: CNOT11

Gene location (Human)
Chr.	Chromosome 2 (human)
Band	2q11.2	Start	101,252,886 bp
Band	2q11.2	End	101,270,316 bp

Gene location (Mouse)
Chr.	Chromosome 1 (mouse)
Band	1 B|1 18.31 cM	Start	39,574,073 bp
Band	1 B|1 18.31 cM	End	39,585,970 bp
RNA expression pattern
Bgee	Human / Mouse (ortholog); Top expressed in: oocyte; secondary oocyte; mucosa of ileum; myocardium of left ventricle; tibialis anterior muscle; rectum; body of pancreas; mucosa of transverse colon; cardiac muscle tissue of right atrium; granulocyte / Top expressed in: primary oocyte; secondary oocyte; hand; epiblast; spermatocyte; zygote; interventricular septum; superior cervical ganglion; endocardial cushion; Gonadal ridge; More reference expression data
BioGPS	n/a
Gene ontology
Molecular function	protein binding; molecular function
Cellular component	cytoplasm; cytosol; nucleus; CCR4-NOT complex
Biological process	nuclear-transcribed mRNA poly(A) tail shortening; gene silencing; cell population proliferation; regulation of transcription, DNA-templated; regulation of translation; transcription, DNA-templated; DNA damage response, signal transduction by p53 class mediator resulting in cell cycle arrest
Sources:Amigo / QuickGO
Orthologs
Databases	NCBI: entry; OMA: entry
Species	Human	Mouse
Entrez	55571	52846
Ensembl	ENSG00000158435	ENSMUSG00000003135
UniProt	Q9UKZ1	Q9CWN7
RefSeq (mRNA)	NM_017546	NM_028043
RefSeq (protein)	NP_060016	NP_082319
Location (UCSC)	Chr 2: 101.25 – 101.27 Mb	Chr 1: 39.57 – 39.59 Mb
PubMed search
- Wikidata
View/Edit Human	View/Edit Mouse

CCR4-NOT transcription complex subunit 11 is a protein that in humans is encoded by the CNOT11 gene. It is a subunit of the CCR4-Not deadenylase complex.
