= CNOT1 =

Protein-coding gene in the species Homo sapiens

Identifiers
- Aliases: CNOT1, CDC39, NOT1, NOT1H, AD-005, CCR4-NOT transcription complex subunit 1, HPE12, VIBOS
- External IDs: OMIM: 604917; MGI: 2442402; GeneCards: CNOT1
Available structures
PDB	Ortholog search: PDBe RCSB
PDB	List of PDB id codes 4C0D, 4CQO, 4CRV, 4CRW, 4CT4, 4CT6, 4CT7, 4GMJ, 4GML, 4J8S, 5ANR, 5FU6, 5FU7

Gene location (Human)
Chr.	Chromosome 16 (human)
Band	16q21	Start	58,519,951 bp
Band	16q21	End	58,629,885 bp

Gene location (Mouse)
Chr.	Chromosome 8 (mouse)
Band	8|8 D1	Start	96,446,079 bp
Band	8|8 D1	End	96,534,092 bp
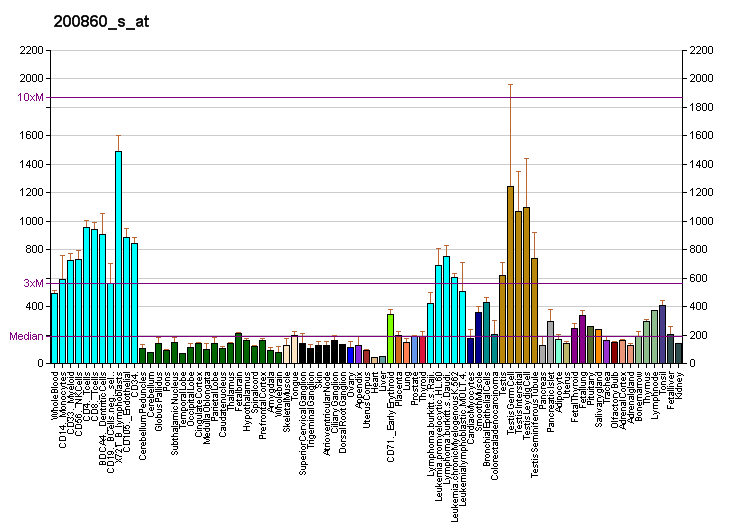

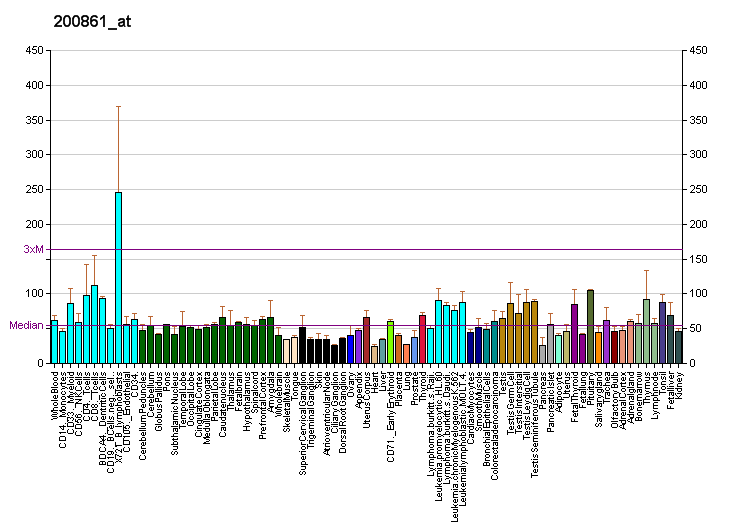
RNA expression pattern
Bgee	Human / Mouse (ortholog); Top expressed in: gonad; left testis; right testis; ventricular zone; ganglionic eminence; mucosa of transverse colon; skin of abdomen; skin of leg; granulocyte; epithelium of colon / Top expressed in: tail of embryo; genital tubercle; spermatocyte; ventricular zone; spermatid; yolk sac; neural layer of retina; zygote; granulocyte; morula; More reference expression data
BioGPS	More reference expression data
Gene ontology
Molecular function	poly(A)-specific ribonuclease activity; protein domain specific binding; protein binding; retinoic acid receptor binding; armadillo repeat domain binding; molecular adaptor activity; estrogen receptor binding; RNA binding
Cellular component	membrane; CCR4-NOT complex; peroxisomal membrane; P-body; CCR4-NOT core complex; nucleus; extracellular space; cytoplasm; cytosol
Biological process	nuclear-transcribed mRNA poly(A) tail shortening; negative regulation of translation; positive regulation of nuclear-transcribed mRNA poly(A) tail shortening; regulation of transcription, DNA-templated; negative regulation of retinoic acid receptor signaling pathway; regulation of stem cell population maintenance; negative regulation of transcription by RNA polymerase II; positive regulation of mRNA catabolic process; transcription, DNA-templated; multicellular organism development; positive regulation of cytoplasmic mRNA processing body assembly; positive regulation of nuclear-transcribed mRNA catabolic process, deadenylation-dependent decay; gene silencing by miRNA; gene silencing; negative regulation of intracellular estrogen receptor signaling pathway; regulation of translation; RNA phosphodiester bond hydrolysis, exonucleolytic; DNA damage response, signal transduction by p53 class mediator resulting in cell cycle arrest
Sources:Amigo / QuickGO
Orthologs
Databases	NCBI: entry; OMA: entry
Species	Human	Mouse
Entrez	23019	234594
Ensembl	ENSG00000125107	ENSMUSG00000036550
UniProt	A5YKK6; H3BNB1	Q6ZQ08
RefSeq (mRNA)	NM_001265612; NM_016284; NM_206999	NM_001205226; NM_153164; NM_178078; NM_001372351; NM_001372353
RefSeq (protein)	NP_001252541; NP_057368; NP_996882	NP_001192155; NP_694804; NP_835179; NP_001359280; NP_001359282
Location (UCSC)	Chr 16: 58.52 – 58.63 Mb	Chr 8: 96.45 – 96.53 Mb
PubMed search
- Wikidata
View/Edit Human	View/Edit Mouse

CCR4-Not complex component, Not1

Identifiers
- Symbol: Not1
- Pfam: PF04054
- InterPro: IPR007196
Available protein structures:
- PDB: IPR007196 PF04054 (ECOD; PDBsum)
- AlphaFold: IPR007196; PF04054

CCR4-NOT transcription complex subunit 1 is a protein that in humans is encoded by the CNOT1 gene.

It is a part of the CCR4-Not complex, which deadenylates mRNAs. CNOT1 acts as a scaffold protein, binding other subunits of the complex.

== Interactions ==
CNOT1 has been shown to interact with CNOT8.
