= CNOT6 =

Protein-coding gene in the species Homo sapiens

Identifiers
- Aliases: CNOT6, CCR4, Ccr4a, CCR4-NOT transcription complex subunit 6
- External IDs: OMIM: 608951; MGI: 2144529; GeneCards: CNOT6
Enzyme activity
EC #	BRENDA	ExPASy	KEGG	MetaCyc
3.1.13.4	↗	↗	↗	↗

Gene location (Human)
Chr.	Chromosome 5 (human)
Band	5q35.3	Start	180,494,379 bp
Band	5q35.3	End	180,578,358 bp

Gene location (Mouse)
Chr.	Chromosome 11 (mouse)
Band	11|11 B1.2	Start	49,562,330 bp
Band	11|11 B1.2	End	49,603,550 bp
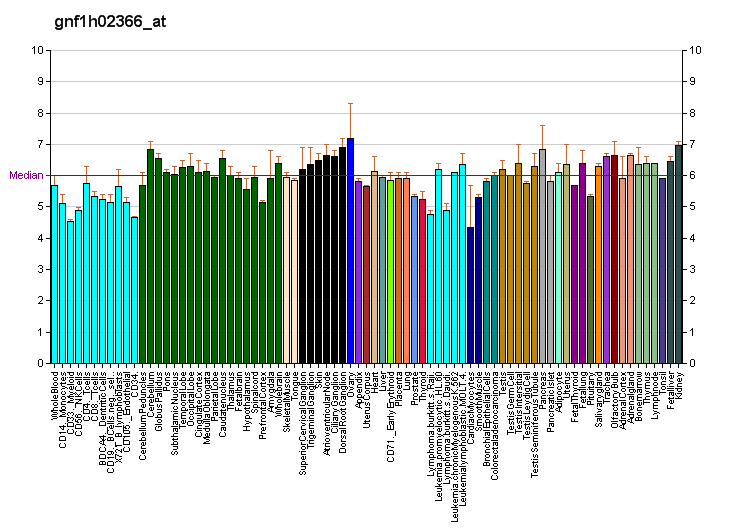

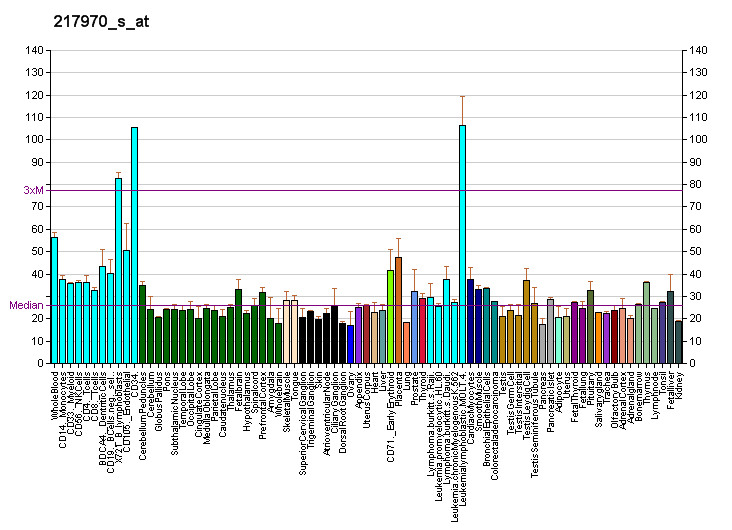
RNA expression pattern
Bgee	Human / Mouse (ortholog); Top expressed in: secondary oocyte; buccal mucosa cell; cerebellar vermis; ganglionic eminence; ventricular zone; retinal pigment epithelium; epithelium of nasopharynx; trabecular bone; amniotic fluid; bronchial epithelial cell / Top expressed in: retinal pigment epithelium; saccule; otic vesicle; ciliary body; ureter; medial ganglionic eminence; cumulus cell; superior cervical ganglion; trigeminal ganglion; otic placode; More reference expression data
BioGPS	More reference expression data
Gene ontology
Molecular function	poly(A)-specific ribonuclease activity; exoribonuclease activity; metal ion binding; protein binding; RNA binding; nuclease activity; exonuclease activity; hydrolase activity; 3'-5'-exoribonuclease activity
Cellular component	cytoplasm; cytosol; membrane; CCR4-NOT complex; nucleus
Biological process	regulation of transcription, DNA-templated; nucleic acid phosphodiester bond hydrolysis; transcription, DNA-templated; positive regulation of cytoplasmic mRNA processing body assembly; gene silencing by miRNA; positive regulation of cell population proliferation; exonucleolytic catabolism of deadenylated mRNA; gene silencing; nuclear-transcribed mRNA catabolic process, no-go decay; regulation of translation; DNA damage response, signal transduction by p53 class mediator resulting in cell cycle arrest; RNA phosphodiester bond hydrolysis, exonucleolytic; nuclear-transcribed mRNA poly(A) tail shortening
Sources:Amigo / QuickGO
Orthologs
Databases	NCBI: entry; OMA: entry
Species	Human	Mouse
Entrez	57472	104625
Ensembl	ENSG00000113300	ENSMUSG00000020362
UniProt	Q9ULM6	Q8K3P5
RefSeq (mRNA)	NM_001303241; NM_015455; NM_001370472; NM_001370473; NM_001370474	NM_001290741; NM_212484; NM_001363356; NM_001363357
RefSeq (protein)	NP_001290170; NP_001357401; NP_001357402; NP_001357403	NP_001277670; NP_997649; NP_001350285; NP_001350286
Location (UCSC)	Chr 5: 180.49 – 180.58 Mb	Chr 11: 49.56 – 49.6 Mb
PubMed search
- Wikidata
View/Edit Human	View/Edit Mouse

CCR4-NOT transcription complex subunit 6 is a protein that in humans is encoded by the CNOT6 gene.

The protein encoded by this gene is a subunit of the CCR4-Not transcriptional regulation and deadenylase complex. The encoded protein has a 3'-5' exonuclease activity and prefers polyadenylated substates.
