= CCR2 =

Mammalian protein found in humans

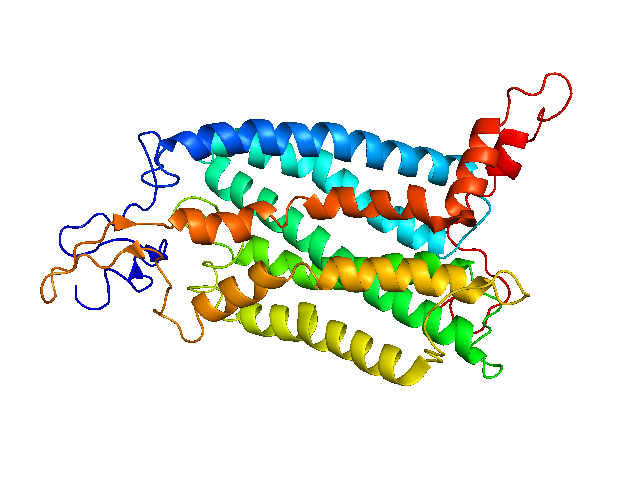

Identifiers
- Aliases: CCR2, CC-CKR-2, CCR-2, CCR2A, CCR2B, CD192, CKR2, CKR2A, CKR2B, CMKBR2, MCP-1-R, C-C motif chemokine receptor 2
- External IDs: OMIM: 601267; MGI: 106185; GeneCards: CCR2
Available structures
PDB	Ortholog search: PDBe RCSB
PDB	List of PDB id codes 1KAD, 1KP1

Gene location (Human)
Chr.	Chromosome 3 (human)
Band	3p21.31	Start	46,353,864 bp
Band	3p21.31	End	46,360,940 bp

Gene location (Mouse)
Chr.	Chromosome 9 (mouse)
Band	9 F4|9 75.05 cM	Start	123,901,987 bp
Band	9 F4|9 75.05 cM	End	123,913,594 bp
RNA expression pattern
Bgee	Human / Mouse (ortholog); Top expressed in: monocyte; granulocyte; blood; bone marrow cell; appendix; spleen; lymph node; trabecular bone; parietal pleura; rectum / Top expressed in: lumbar spinal ganglion; blood; tibiofemoral joint; granulocyte; ankle; intercostal muscle; body of femur; bone marrow; ankle joint; subcutaneous adipose tissue; More reference expression data
BioGPS	n/a
Gene ontology
Molecular function	CCR2 chemokine receptor binding; G protein-coupled receptor activity; protein homodimerization activity; signal transducer activity; chemokine receptor activity; C-C chemokine receptor activity; protein binding; cytokine binding; chemokine (C-C motif) ligand 2 binding; chemokine (C-C motif) ligand 12 binding; chemokine (C-C motif) ligand 7 binding; chemokine binding; C-C chemokine binding
Cellular component	integral component of membrane; perikaryon; membrane; plasma membrane; integral component of plasma membrane; soma; dendrite; perinuclear region of cytoplasm; cytoplasm; cytosol; external side of plasma membrane
Biological process	negative regulation of adenylate cyclase activity; receptor signaling pathway via JAK-STAT; chemokine-mediated signaling pathway; cellular calcium ion homeostasis; positive regulation of monocyte chemotaxis; dendritic cell chemotaxis; chemotaxis; blood vessel remodeling; response to wounding; immune response; inflammatory response; viral process; positive regulation of astrocyte chemotaxis; signal transduction; positive regulation of cytosolic calcium ion concentration; G protein-coupled receptor signaling pathway; monocyte chemotaxis; positive regulation of T-helper 1 type immune response; negative regulation of type 2 immune response; humoral immune response; cellular defense response; regulation of vascular endothelial growth factor production; positive regulation of T cell chemotaxis; negative regulation of angiogenesis; sensory perception of pain; cellular homeostasis; regulation of cell migration; positive regulation of interferon-gamma production; positive regulation of interleukin-2 production; T-helper 17 cell chemotaxis; negative regulation of eosinophil degranulation; positive regulation of alpha-beta T cell proliferation; homeostasis of number of cells within a tissue; positive regulation of inflammatory response; positive regulation of T cell activation; leukocyte adhesion to vascular endothelial cell; positive regulation of immune complex clearance by monocytes and macrophages; neutrophil clearance; positive regulation of leukocyte tethering or rolling; positive regulation of monocyte extravasation; positive regulation of CD8-positive, alpha-beta T cell extravasation; positive regulation of hematopoietic stem cell migration; cytokine-mediated signaling pathway; hemopoiesis; calcium-mediated signaling; cell chemotaxis; positive regulation of cold-induced thermogenesis; regulation of T cell cytokine production; monocyte extravasation; regulation of T cell differentiation; regulation of inflammatory response; positive regulation of synaptic transmission, glutamatergic; inflammatory response to wounding; macrophage migration; positive regulation of thymocyte migration; positive regulation of NMDA glutamate receptor activity
Sources:Amigo / QuickGO
Orthologs
Databases	NCBI: entry; OMA: entry
Species	Human	Mouse
Entrez	729230	12772
Ensembl	ENSG00000121807	ENSMUSG00000049103
UniProt	P41597	P51683
RefSeq (mRNA)	NM_001123041; NM_001123396	NM_009915
RefSeq (protein)	NP_001116513; NP_001116868; NP_001116868.1	NP_034045
Location (UCSC)	Chr 3: 46.35 – 46.36 Mb	Chr 9: 123.9 – 123.91 Mb
PubMed search
- Wikidata
View/Edit Human	View/Edit Mouse

C-C chemokine receptor type 2 (CCR2 or CD192 (cluster of differentiation 192) is a protein that in humans is encoded by the CCR2 gene. CCR2 is a CC chemokine receptor.

== Gene ==
This CCR2 gene is located in the chemokine receptor gene cluster region. Two alternatively spliced transcript variants are expressed by the gene.

== Function ==
This gene encodes two isoforms of a receptor for monocyte chemoattractant protein-1 (CCL2), a chemokine which specifically mediates monocyte chemotaxis. Monocyte chemoattractant protein-1 is involved in monocyte infiltration in inflammatory diseases such as rheumatoid arthritis as well as in the inflammatory response against tumors. The receptors encoded by this gene mediate agonist-dependent calcium mobilization and inhibition of adenylyl cyclase.

== Animal studies ==
=== Alzheimer ===
CCR2 deficient mice have been shown to develop an accelerated Alzheimer's-like pathology in comparison to wild type mice. This is not the first time that immune function and inflammation have been linked to age-related cognitive decline (i.e. dementia).

=== Obesity ===
Within the fat (adipose) tissue of CCR2-deficient mice, there is an increased number of eosinophils, greater alternative macrophage activation, and a propensity towards type 2 cytokine expression. Furthermore, this effect was exaggerated when the mice became obese from a high fat diet.

=== Myocardial infarction ===
CCR2 surface expression on blood monocytes changes in a time-of-day–dependent manner (being higher at the beginning of the active phase) and affects monocytes recruitment in tissues including the heart. As a consequence when an acute ischemic event happens during the active phase, monocytes are more susceptible to invade the heart. An excessive monocytes infiltration generates higher inflammation and increases the risk of heart failure.

== Clinical significance ==
In an observational study of gene expression in blood leukocytes in humans, Harries et al. found evidence of a relationship between expression of CCR2 and cognitive function (assessed using the mini-mental state examination, MMSE). Higher CCR2 expression was associated with worse performance on the MMSE assessment of cognitive function. The same study found that CCR2 expression was also associated with cognitive decline over 9-years in a sub-analysis on inflammatory related transcripts only. Harries et al. suggest that CCR2 signaling may have a direct role in human cognition, partly because expression of CCR2 was associated with the ApoE haplotype (previously associated with Alzheimer's disease), but also because CCL2 is expressed at high concentrations in macrophages found in atherosclerotic plaques and in brain microglia. The difference in observations between mice (CCR2 depletion causes cognitive decline) and humans (higher CCR2 associated with lower cognitive function) could be due to increased demand for macrophage activation during cognitive decline, associated with increased β-amyloid deposition (a core feature of Alzheimer's disease progression).

== See also ==
- CC chemokine receptors
- Cluster of differentiation
