= CXCL5 =

Mammalian protein found in humans

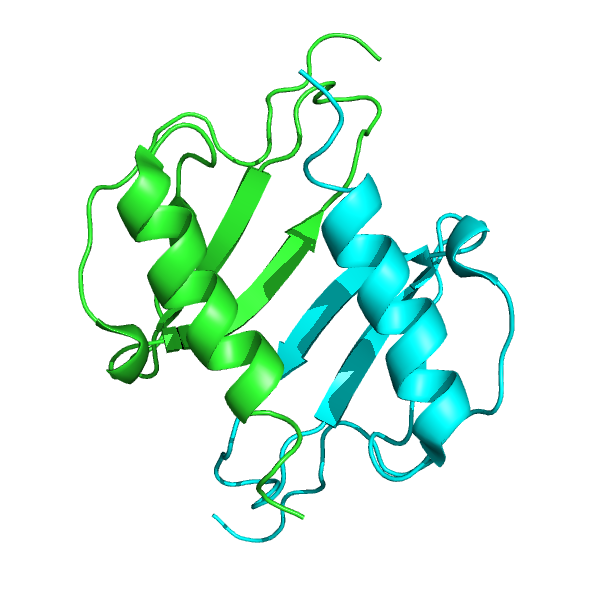

Identifiers
- Aliases: CXCL5, ENA-78, SCYB5, C-X-C motif chemokine ligand 5
- External IDs: OMIM: 600324; MGI: 1096868; GeneCards: CXCL5
Available structures
PDB	Ortholog search: PDBe RCSB
PDB	List of PDB id codes 2MGS

Gene location (Human)
Chr.	Chromosome 4 (human)
Band	4q13.3	Start	73,995,642 bp
Band	4q13.3	End	73,998,677 bp

Gene location (Mouse)
Chr.	Chromosome 5 (mouse)
Band	5 E1|5 44.78 cM	Start	90,907,219 bp
Band	5 E1|5 44.78 cM	End	90,909,483 bp
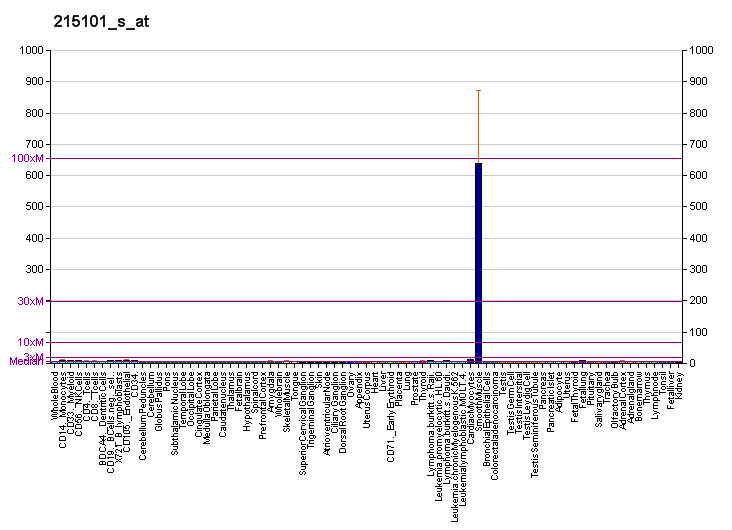

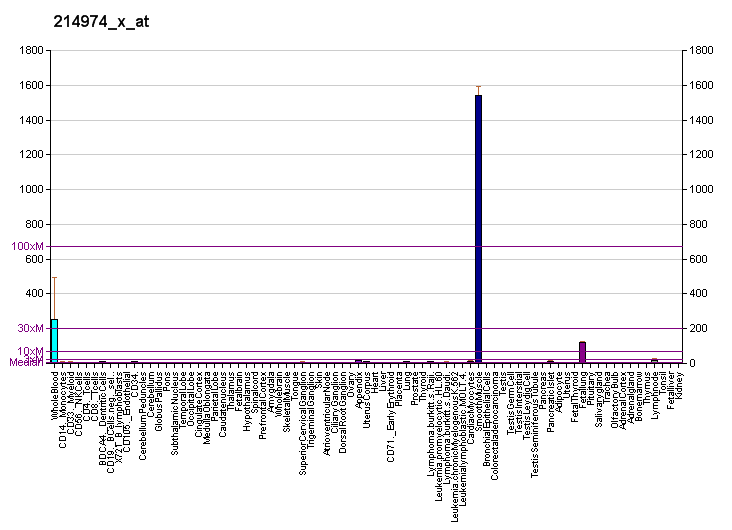
RNA expression pattern
Bgee	Human / Mouse (ortholog); Top expressed in: monocyte; appendix; cartilage tissue; pancreatic epithelial cell; minor salivary glands; islet of Langerhans; testicle; pancreatic ductal cell; gallbladder; palpebral conjunctiva / Top expressed in: right lobe of liver; cervix; endothelial cell of lymphatic vessel; trachea; respiratory epithelium; olfactory epithelium; mandibular molars; embryo; embryo; conjunctival fornix; More reference expression data
BioGPS	More reference expression data
Gene ontology
Molecular function	CXCR chemokine receptor binding; cytokine activity; chemokine activity; identical protein binding
Cellular component	extracellular region; extracellular space
Biological process	positive regulation of cell population proliferation; inflammatory response; response to lipopolysaccharide; signal transduction; cell-cell signaling; immune response; chemokine-mediated signaling pathway; cell chemotaxis; neutrophil mediated immunity; chemotaxis; defense response; positive regulation of neutrophil chemotaxis; regulation of signaling receptor activity; G protein-coupled receptor signaling pathway; neutrophil chemotaxis; leukocyte chemotaxis; antimicrobial humoral immune response mediated by antimicrobial peptide; cellular response to lipopolysaccharide
Sources:Amigo / QuickGO
Orthologs
Databases	NCBI: entry; OMA: entry
Species	Human	Mouse
Entrez	6374	20311
Ensembl	ENSG00000163735	ENSMUSG00000029371
UniProt	P42830	P50228
RefSeq (mRNA)	NM_002994	NM_009141
RefSeq (protein)	NP_002985	NP_033167
Location (UCSC)	Chr 4: 74 – 74 Mb	Chr 5: 90.91 – 90.91 Mb
PubMed search
- Wikidata
View/Edit Human	View/Edit Mouse

C-X-C motif chemokine 5 (CXCL5 or ENA78) is a protein that in humans is encoded by the CXCL5 gene.

== Function ==
The protein encoded by this gene, CXCL5 is a small cytokine belonging to the CXC chemokine family that is also known as epithelial-derived neutrophil-activating peptide 78 (ENA-78). It is produced following stimulation of cells with the inflammatory cytokines interleukin-1 or tumor necrosis factor-alpha. Expression of CXCL5 has also been observed in eosinophils, and can be inhibited with the type II interferon IFN-γ. This chemokine stimulates the chemotaxis of neutrophils possessing angiogenic properties. It elicits these effects by interacting with the cell surface chemokine receptor CXCR2. The gene for CXCL5 has four exons and is located on human chromosome 4 amongst several other CXC chemokine genes. CXCL5 has been implicated in connective tissue remodelling. CXCL5 has been also described to regulate neutrophil homeostasis.

== Clinical significance ==
CXCL5 plays a role in reducing sensitivity to sunburn pain in some subjects, and is a "potential target which can be utilized to understand more about pain in other inflammatory conditions like arthritis and cystitis.". CXCL5 is well known to have chemotactic and activating functions on neutrophil, mainly during acute inflammatory responses. However CXCL5 expression is also higher in atherosclerosis (a chronic inflammatory condition) but is not associated with neutrophil infiltration. Instead CXCL5 has a protective role in atherosclerosis by directly controlling macrophage foam cell formation.
