= CXC chemokine receptors =

Protein family

CXCR1

Identifiers
- Symbol: IL8RA
- NCBI gene: 3577
- OMIM: 146929
- RefSeq: NM_000634
- UniProt: P25024

Other data
- Locus: Chr. 2 q35
Search for
- Structures: Swiss-model
- Domains: InterPro

CXCR2

Identifiers
- Symbol: IL8RB
- NCBI gene: 3579
- OMIM: 146928
- RefSeq: NM_001557
- UniProt: P25025

Other data
- Locus: Chr. 2 q35
Search for
- Structures: Swiss-model
- Domains: InterPro

CXCR3

Identifiers
- Symbol: CXCR3
- NCBI gene: 2833
- OMIM: 300574
- RefSeq: NM_001504
- UniProt: P49682

Other data
- Locus: Chr. X q13
Search for
- Structures: Swiss-model
- Domains: InterPro

CXCR4

Identifiers
- Symbol: CXCR4
- NCBI gene: 7852
- OMIM: 162643
- RefSeq: NM_001008540
- UniProt: P61073

Other data
- Locus: Chr. 2 q21
Search for
- Structures: Swiss-model
- Domains: InterPro

CXCR5

Identifiers
- Symbol: BLR1
- NCBI gene: 643
- OMIM: 601613
- RefSeq: NM_001716
- UniProt: P32302

Other data
- Locus: Chr. 11 q23
Search for
- Structures: Swiss-model
- Domains: InterPro

CXCR6

Identifiers
- Symbol: CXCR6
- NCBI gene: 10663
- OMIM: 605163
- RefSeq: NM_006564
- UniProt: O00574

Other data
- Locus: Chr. 3 p21
Search for
- Structures: Swiss-model
- Domains: InterPro

CXC chemokine receptors are integral membrane proteins that specifically bind and respond to cytokines of the CXC chemokine family. They represent one subfamily of chemokine receptors, a large family of G protein-linked receptors that are known as seven transmembrane (7-TM) proteins, since they span the cell membrane seven times. There are currently six known CXC chemokine receptors in mammals, named CXCR1 through CXCR6.

== CXCR1 and CXCR2 ==
CXCR1 and CXCR2 are closely related receptors that recognize CXC chemokines that possess an E-L-R amino acid motif immediately adjacent to their CXC motif. CXCL8 (otherwise known as interleukin-8) and CXCL6 can both bind CXCR1 in humans, while all other ELR-positive chemokines, such as CXCL1 to CXCL7 bind only CXCR2. They are both expressed on the surface of neutrophils in mammals.

== CXCR3 ==
CXCR3 is expressed predominantly on T cells (T lymphocytes), and also on other lymphocytes [some B cells (B lymphocytes) and NK cells] and is highly induced following cell activation. There are two isoforms, CXCR3-A and CXCR3-B. It has three highly related ligands in mammals, CXCL9, CXCL10 and CXCL11.

== CXCR4 ==
CXCR4 (also known as fusin) is the receptor for a chemokine known as CXCL12 (or SDF-1) and, as with CCR5, is utilized by HIV-1 to gain entry into target cells. This receptor has a wide cellular distribution, with expression on most immature and mature hematopoietic cell types (e.g. neutrophils, monocytes, T and B cells, dendritic cells, Langerhans cells and macrophages). In addition, CXCR4 can also be found on vascular endothelial cells and neuronal/nerve cells.

== CXCR5 ==
The chemokine receptor CXCR5 is expressed on B cells and CD4+ Tfh cells and is involved in lymphocyte homing and the development of normal lymphoid tissue. Its principal ligand is CXCL13 (or BLC).

== CXCR6 ==
CXCR6 was formerly called three different names (STRL33, BONZO, and TYMSTR) before being assigned CXCR6 based on its chromosomal location (within the chemokine receptor cluster on human chromosome 3p21) and its similarity to other chemokine receptors in its gene sequence. CXCR6 binds the ligand CXCL16. However, CXCR6 is more closely related in structure to CC chemokine receptors than to other CXC chemokine receptors.

== History ==
ACKR3 was originally called RDC-1 (an orphan receptor) but has since been shown to cause chemotaxis in T lymphocytes in response to CXCL12 (the ligand for CXCR4) prompting the renaming of this molecule as CXCR7. ACKR3 designation has been accepted by the IUIS/WHO Subcommittee on Chemokine Nomenclature. This receptor has also been identified on memory B cells.
