= CXCL3 =

Mammalian protein found in humans

Identifiers
- Aliases: CXCL3, CINC-2b, GRO3, GROg, MIP-2b, MIP2B, SCYB3, C-X-C motif chemokine ligand 3
- External IDs: OMIM: 139111; MGI: 1340094; GeneCards: CXCL3

Gene location (Human)
Chr.	Chromosome 4 (human)
Band	4q13.3	Start	74,036,589 bp
Band	4q13.3	End	74,038,807 bp

Gene location (Mouse)
Chr.	Chromosome 5 (mouse)
Band	5 E1|5 44.78 cM	Start	91,051,730 bp
Band	5 E1|5 44.78 cM	End	91,053,797 bp
RNA expression pattern
Bgee	Human / Mouse (ortholog); Top expressed in: cartilage tissue; testicle; mucosa of paranasal sinus; pylorus; pancreatic epithelial cell; appendix; upper lobe of left lung; rectum; olfactory zone of nasal mucosa; islet of Langerhans / Top expressed in: granulocyte; stroma of bone marrow; embryo; endothelial cell of lymphatic vessel; embryo; islet of Langerhans; spermatid; lumbar subsegment of spinal cord; lumbar spinal ganglion; thymus; More reference expression data
BioGPS	n/a
Gene ontology
Molecular function	chemokine activity; cytokine activity; CXCR chemokine receptor binding
Cellular component	extracellular region; extracellular space
Biological process	chemokine-mediated signaling pathway; chemotaxis; response to lipopolysaccharide; inflammatory response; regulation of cell population proliferation; immune response; neutrophil chemotaxis; positive regulation of neutrophil chemotaxis; defense response; antimicrobial humoral immune response mediated by antimicrobial peptide; regulation of signaling receptor activity; G protein-coupled receptor signaling pathway; leukocyte chemotaxis; cellular response to lipopolysaccharide
Sources:Amigo / QuickGO
Orthologs
Databases	NCBI: entry; OMA: entry
Species	Human	Mouse
Entrez	2921	20310
Ensembl	ENSG00000163734	ENSMUSG00000058427
UniProt	P19876	P10889
RefSeq (mRNA)	NM_002090	NM_009140
RefSeq (protein)	NP_002081	NP_033166
Location (UCSC)	Chr 4: 74.04 – 74.04 Mb	Chr 5: 91.05 – 91.05 Mb
PubMed search
- Wikidata
View/Edit Human	View/Edit Mouse

Chemokine (C-X-C motif) ligand 3 (CXCL3) is a small cytokine belonging to the CXC chemokine family that is also known as GRO3 oncogene (GRO3), GRO protein gamma (GROg) and macrophage inflammatory protein-2-beta (MIP2b). CXCL3 controls migration and adhesion of monocytes and mediates its effects on its target cell by interacting with a cell surface chemokine receptor called CXCR2. More recently, it has been shown that Cxcl3 regulates cell autonomously the migration of the precursors of cerebellar granule neurons toward the internal layers of cerebellum, during the morphogenesis of cerebellum. Moreover, if the expression of Cxcl3 is reduced in cerebellar granule neuron precursors, this highly enhances the frequency of the medulloblastoma, the tumor of cerebellum. In fact, the reduced expression of Cxcl3 forces the cerebellar granule neuron precursors to remain at the surface of the cerebellum, where they highly proliferate under the stimulus of Sonic hedgehog, becoming target of transforming insults. Remarkably, the treatment with CXCL3 completely prevents the growth of medulloblastoma lesions in a Shh-type mouse model of medulloblastoma. Thus, CXCL3 is a target for medulloblastoma therapy. Cxcl3 is directly regulated transcriptionally by BTG2

The gene for CXCL3 is located on chromosome 4 in a cluster of other CXC chemokines.
