= CXCR3 =

Protein-coding gene in humans

Identifiers
- Aliases: CXCR3, CD183, CKR-L2, CMKAR3, GPR9, IP10-R, Mig-R, MigR, C-X-C motif chemokine receptor 3, CD182
- External IDs: OMIM: 300574; MGI: 1277207; GeneCards: CXCR3

Gene location (Human)
Chr.	X chromosome (human)
Band	Xq13.1	Start	71,615,916 bp
Band	Xq13.1	End	71,618,511 bp

Gene location (Mouse)
Chr.	X chromosome (mouse)
Band	X D|X 44.58 cM	Start	100,775,141 bp
Band	X D|X 44.58 cM	End	100,777,875 bp
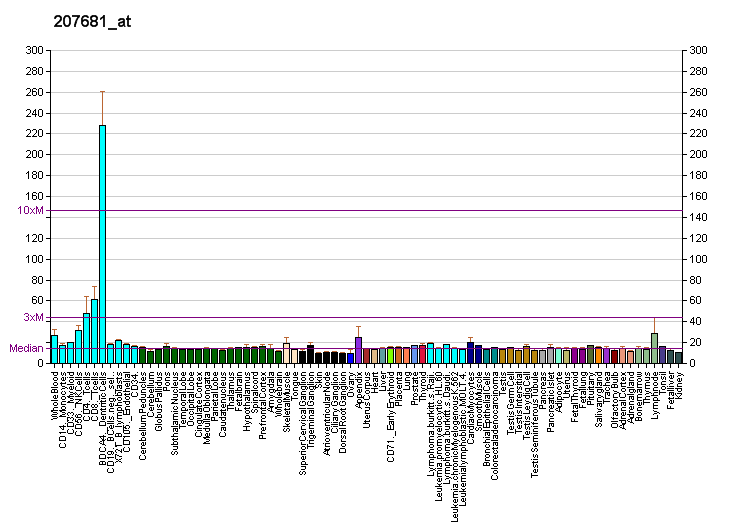

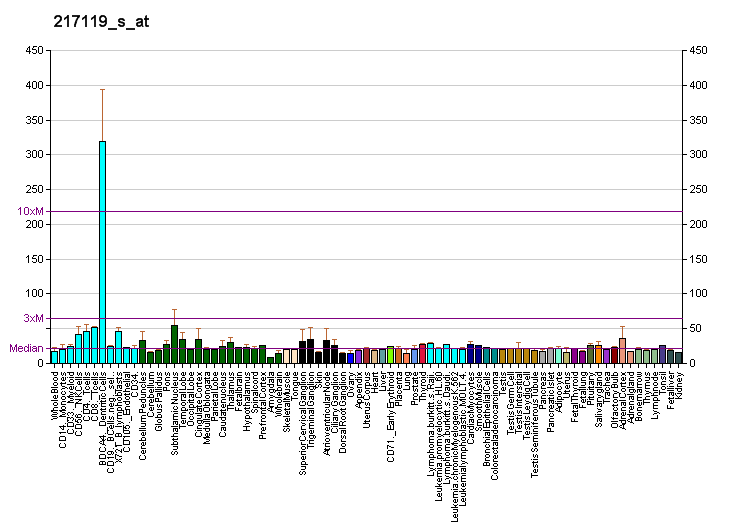
RNA expression pattern
Bgee	Human / Mouse (ortholog); Top expressed in: granulocyte; testicle; lymph node; blood; spleen; appendix; mucosa of transverse colon; bone marrow; duodenum; gallbladder / Top expressed in: secondary oocyte; zygote; primary oocyte; mesenteric lymph nodes; submandibular gland; blood; spleen; embryo; stroma of bone marrow; granulocyte; More reference expression data
BioGPS	More reference expression data
Gene ontology
Molecular function	C-X-C chemokine receptor activity; G protein-coupled receptor activity; C-X-C chemokine binding; signal transducer activity; chemokine binding; chemokine receptor activity; protein binding; signaling receptor activity; C-C chemokine receptor activity; C-C chemokine binding
Cellular component	cytoplasm; integral component of membrane; membrane; integral component of plasma membrane; cell surface; external side of plasma membrane; plasma membrane; intracellular anatomical structure
Biological process	negative regulation of execution phase of apoptosis; positive regulation of execution phase of apoptosis; positive regulation of cytosolic calcium ion concentration; T cell chemotaxis; chemokine-mediated signaling pathway; positive regulation of release of sequestered calcium ion into cytosol; positive regulation of cAMP-mediated signaling; regulation of leukocyte migration; positive regulation of angiogenesis; negative regulation of endothelial cell proliferation; cell surface receptor signaling pathway; cell adhesion; positive regulation of chemotaxis; angiogenesis; positive regulation of cell population proliferation; chemokine (C-C motif) ligand 11 production; negative regulation of angiogenesis; inflammatory response; calcium-mediated signaling; positive regulation of transcription by RNA polymerase II; signal transduction; apoptotic process; chemotaxis; G protein-coupled receptor signaling pathway; adenylate cyclase-activating G protein-coupled receptor signaling pathway; immune response; cell chemotaxis; regulation of cell adhesion
Sources:Amigo / QuickGO
Orthologs
Databases	NCBI: entry; OMA: entry
Species	Human	Mouse
Entrez	2833	12766
Ensembl	ENSG00000186810	ENSMUSG00000050232
UniProt	P49682	O88410
RefSeq (mRNA)	NM_001142797; NM_001504	NM_009910
RefSeq (protein)	NP_001136269; NP_001495	NP_034040
Location (UCSC)	Chr X: 71.62 – 71.62 Mb	Chr X: 100.78 – 100.78 Mb
PubMed search
- Wikidata
View/Edit Human	View/Edit Mouse

Chemokine receptor CXCR3 is a Gα_{i} protein-coupled receptor in the CXC chemokine receptor family. Other names for CXCR3 are G protein-coupled receptor 9 (GPR9) and CD183. There are three isoforms of CXCR3 in humans: CXCR3-A, CXCR3-B and chemokine receptor 3-alternative (CXCR3-alt). CXCR3-A binds to the CXC chemokines CXCL9 (MIG), CXCL10 (IP-10), and CXCL11 (I-TAC) whereas CXCR3-B can also bind to CXCL4 in addition to CXCL9, CXCL10, and CXCL11.

== Expression ==
CXCR3 is expressed primarily on activated T lymphocytes and NK cells, and some epithelial cells. CXCR3 and CCR5 are preferentially expressed on Th1 cells, whereas Th2 cells favor the expression of CCR3 and CCR4. CXCR3 ligands that attract Th1 cells can concomitantly block the migration of Th2 cells in response to CCR3 ligands, thus enhancing the polarization of effector T cell recruitment.

== Signal transduction ==
Binding of CXCL9, CXCL10, and CXCL11 to CXCR3 is able to elicit increases in intracellular Ca^{2++} levels and activate phosphoinositide 3-kinase and mitogen-activated protein kinase (MAPK). Detailed signaling pathway has not yet been established, but may include the same enzymes that were identified in the signaling cascade induced by other chemokine receptors.

== Function ==
CXCR3 is able to regulate leukocyte trafficking. Binding of chemokines to CXCR3 induces various cellular responses, most notably integrin activation, cytoskeletal changes and chemotactic migration. CXCR3-ligand interaction attracts Th1 cells and promotes Th1 cell maturation.

As a consequence of chemokine-induced cellular desensitization (phosphorylation-dependent receptor internalization), cellular responses are typically rapid and short in duration. Cellular responsiveness is restored after dephosphorylation of intracellular receptors and subsequent recycling to the cell surface. A hallmark of CXCR3 is its prominent expression in in vitro cultured effector/memory T cells, and in T cells present in many types of inflamed tissues. In addition, CXCL9, CXCL10 and CXCL11 are commonly produced by local cells in inflammatory lesion, suggesting that CXCR3 and its chemokines participate in the recruitment of inflammatory cells. Additionally, CXCR3 has been implicated in wound healing.

== Clinical significance ==
CXCR3 has been implicated in the following diseases atherosclerosis, multiple sclerosis, pulmonary fibrosis, type 1 diabetes, autoimmune myasthenia gravis, nephrotoxic nephritis, acute cardiac allograft rejection, allergic contact dermatitis, and possibly Celiac Disease. It may also have implications in lung tissue repair after exposure to cigarette smoking. Development of agents to block CXCR3-ligand interactions may provide new ways to treat these diseases. In addition, CXCR3 has been implicated in inflammatory brain damage in central nervous system (CNS) infections

== Cardiovascular implications ==
Evidence from pre-clinical and clinical investigations has revealed the involvement of CXCR3 and its ligands in several cardiovascular diseases (CVDs) of diverse etiologies including atherosclerosis, hypertension, Kawasaki disease, myocarditis, dilated cardiomyopathies, Chagas, cardiac hypertrophy and heart failure, as well as in heart transplant rejection and transplant coronary artery disease (CAD). CXCL9-10-11 have been recognized to be valid biomarkers for the development of heart failure and left ventricular dysfunction in two pilot studies, suggesting an underlining correlation between levels of the interferon (IFN)-γ-inducible chemokines and the development of adverse cardiac remodeling.

== Pharmacology ==
Recent reports indicate that there is a significant interest for the identification of small-molecule antagonists of CXCR3. Several small molecules were found to constitute a promising series of functional antagonists of CXCR3 that could be developed into new therapeutic agents for the treatment of inflammatory disorders such as rheumatoid arthritis, inflammatory bowel disease, multiple sclerosis and diabetes. More recently the first QSAR study concerning antagonists of CXCR3 has been published in the literature. The in silico model provides a time- and cost-effective tool for the screening of existing and virtual libraries of small molecules as well as for designing of novel molecules of desired activity.

== See also ==
- Chemokine receptors
- Chemokine
- Cluster of differentiation
