= Chemokine =

Small cytokines or signaling proteins secreted by cells

Small cytokines (intecrine/chemokine), interleukin-8 like
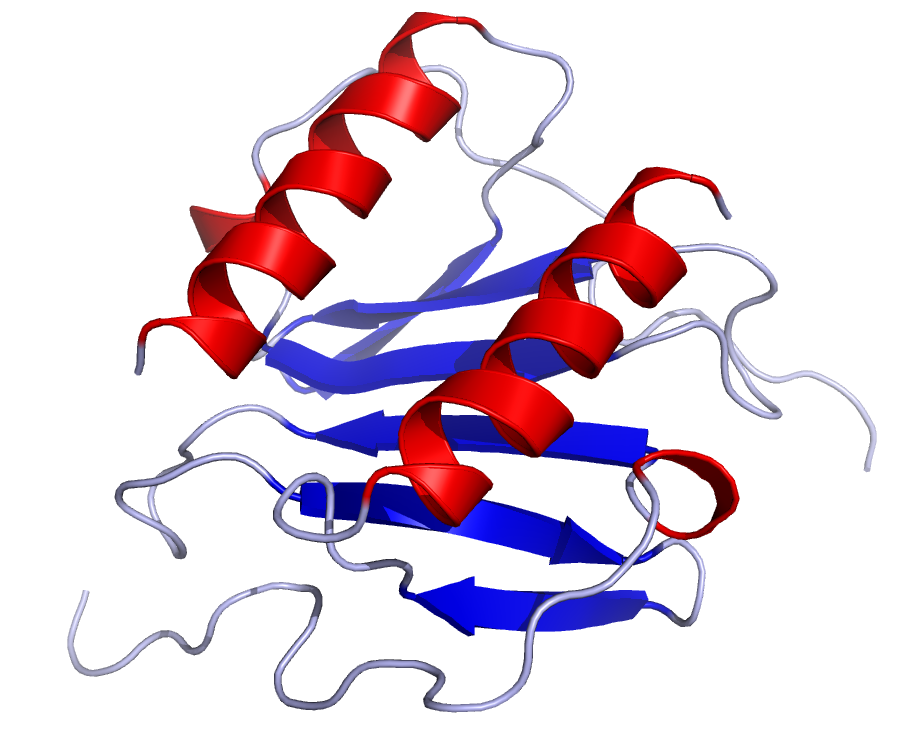
- Solution structure of interleukin-8, a chemokine of the CXC subfamily

Identifiers
- Symbol: IL8
- Pfam: PF00048
- InterPro: IPR001811
- PROSITE: PDOC00434
- SCOP2: 3il8 / SCOPe / SUPFAM
Available protein structures:
- PDB: 1dokA:24-90 1dol :24-90 1donA:24-90 1mcaB:29-90 1ml0D:24-90 1domB:24-90 1bo0 :24-90 1ncvB:24-90 1esrA:24-90 1eot :24-88 2eot :24-88 1eihA:27-89 1eigA:27-89 1je4A:24-89 1hunA:24-89 1humA:24-89 1b53B:24-88 1b50B:24-88 1eqtB:26-88 1rtoB:24-88 1u4rD:24-88 1hrjB:24-88 1u4pB:24-88 1b3aB:25-88 1rtnA:24-88 1u4lA:24-88 1u4mA:24-88 1g91A:45-109 2hcc :48-108 1zxtA:26-91 1vmpA:26-89 1cm9B:26-89 1hfgA:26-89 1hfnA:26-89 1hhvA:26-89 1hffA:26-33 1g2sA:24-88 1g2tA:24-88 1j8iA:23-84 1j9oA:23-84 1el0A:24-88 1nr4A:24-88 1nr2A:24-88 1f2lB:26-89 1b2tA:26-89 1m8aA:27-89 1ha6A:28-90 2il8A:29-93 1ilpA:28-93 1qe6A:28-93 1ikm :31-93 3il8 :32-93 1ikl :31-93 1icwB:34-93 1ilqB:28-93 1il8B:29-93 1tvxC:61-121 1napD:59-121 1f9pA:54-121 1mgsB:35-101 1mshA:35-101 1msgA:35-101 1mi2A:28-94 1rhpD:38-98 1f9sB:32-98 1pfmC:39-98 1f9rD:32-98 1pfnA:39-98 1f9qD:32-98 1dn3A:87-98 1plfD:21-82 1rjtA:22-89 1o7zB:22-89 1o7yB:22-89 1o80A:22-89 1lv9A:22-89 1sdf :22-87 1qg7B:22-87 1a15B:29-85 2sdf :22-87 1vmcA:22-87 IPR001811 PF00048 (ECOD; PDBsum)
- AlphaFold: IPR001811; PF00048

Chemokines (from Ancient Greek χῠμείᾱ (khumeíā) 'alchemy' and κῑ́νησῐς (kī́nēsis) 'movement'), or chemotactic cytokines, are a family of small cytokines or signaling proteins secreted by cells that induce directional movement of leukocytes, as well as other cell types, including endothelial and epithelial cells. In addition to playing a major role in the activation of host immune responses, chemokines are important for biological processes, including morphogenesis and wound healing, as well as in the pathogenesis of diseases like cancers.

Cytokine proteins are classified as chemokines according to behavior and structural characteristics. In addition to being known for mediating chemotaxis, chemokines are all approximately 8–10 kilodaltons in mass and have four cysteine residues in conserved locations that are key to forming their 3-dimensional shape.

These proteins have historically been known under several other names including the SIS family of cytokines, SIG family of cytokines, SCY family of cytokines, Platelet factor-4 superfamily or intercrines. Some chemokines are considered pro-inflammatory and can be induced during an immune response to recruit cells of the immune system to a site of infection, while others are considered homeostatic and are involved in controlling the migration of cells during normal processes of tissue maintenance or development. Chemokines are found in all vertebrates, some viruses and some bacteria, but none have been found in other invertebrates.

Chemokines have been classified into four main subfamilies: CXC, CC, CX3C and C. All of these proteins exert their biological effects by interacting with G protein-linked transmembrane receptors (GPCRs) called chemokine receptors, that are selectively found on the surfaces of their target cells.

== Function ==
Chemokines released by infected or damaged cells form a concentration gradient. Attracted cells move through the gradient towards the higher concentration of chemokine.

The major role of chemokines is to act as a chemoattractant to guide the migration of cells. Cells that are attracted by chemokines follow a signal of increasing chemokine concentration towards the source of the chemokine. Some chemokines control cells of the immune system during processes of immune surveillance, such as directing lymphocytes to the lymph nodes so they can screen for invasion of pathogens by interacting with antigen-presenting cells residing in these tissues. These are known as homeostatic chemokines and are produced and secreted without any need to stimulate their source cells. Some chemokines have roles in development; they promote angiogenesis (the growth of new blood vessels), or guide cells to tissues that provide specific signals critical for cellular maturation. Other chemokines are inflammatory and are released from a wide variety of cells in response to bacterial infection, viruses and agents that cause physical damage such as silica or the urate crystals that occur in gout. Their release is often stimulated by pro-inflammatory cytokines such as interleukin 1. Inflammatory chemokines function mainly as chemoattractants for leukocytes, recruiting monocytes, neutrophils and other effector cells from the blood to sites of infection or tissue damage. Certain inflammatory chemokines activate cells to initiate an immune response or promote wound healing. They are released by many different cell types and serve to guide cells of both innate immune system and adaptive immune system.

== Types by function ==
Chemokines are functionally divided into two groups:

- Homeostatic: are constitutively produced in certain tissues and are responsible for basal leukocyte migration. These include: CCL14, CCL19, CCL20, CCL21, CCL25, CCL27, CXCL12 and CXCL13. This classification is not strict; for example, CCL20 can act also as pro-inflammatory chemokine.
- Inflammatory: these are formed under pathological conditions (on pro-inflammatory stimuli, such as IL-1, TNF-alpha, LPS, or viruses) and actively participate in the inflammatory response attracting immune cells to the site of inflammation. Examples are: CXCL-8, CCL2, CCL3, CCL4, CCL5, CCL11, CXCL10.

== Homing ==
The main function of chemokines is to manage the migration of leukocytes (homing) in the respective anatomical locations in inflammatory and homeostatic processes.

Basal: homeostatic chemokines are basal produced in the thymus and lymphoid tissues. Their homeostatic function in homing is best exemplified by the chemokines CCL19 and CCL21 (expressed within lymph nodes and on lymphatic endothelial cells) and their receptor CCR7 (expressed on cells destined for homing in cells to these organs). Using these ligands is possible routing antigen-presenting cells (APC) to lymph nodes during the adaptive immune response. Among other homeostatic chemokine receptors include: CCR9, CCR10, and CXCR5, which are important as part of the cell addresses for tissue-specific homing of leukocytes. CCR9 supports the migration of leukocytes into the intestine, CCR10 to the skin and CXCR5 supports the migration of B-cell to follicles of lymph nodes. As well CXCL12 (SDF-1) constitutively produced in the bone marrow promotes proliferation of progenitor B cells in the bone marrow microenvironment.

Inflammatory: inflammatory chemokines are produced in high concentrations during infection or injury and determine the migration of inflammatory leukocytes into the damaged area. Typical inflammatory chemokines include: CCL2, CCL3 and CCL5, CXCL1, CXCL2 and CXCL8. A typical example is CXCL-8, which acts as a chemoattractant for neutrophils. In contrast to the homeostatic chemokine receptors, there is significant promiscuity (redundancy) associated with binding receptor and inflammatory chemokines. This often complicates research on receptor-specific therapeutics in this area.

== Types by cell attracted ==
- Monocytes / macrophages: the key chemokines that attract these cells to the site of inflammation include: CCL2, CCL3, CCL5, CCL7, CCL8, CCL13, CCL17 and CCL22.
- T-lymphocytes: the four key chemokines that are involved in the recruitment of T lymphocytes to the site of inflammation are: CCL2, CCL1, CCL22 and CCL17. Furthermore, CXCR3 expression by T-cells is induced following T-cell activation and activated T-cells are attracted to sites of inflammation where the IFN-y inducible chemokines CXCL9, CXCL10 and CXCL11 are secreted.
- Mast cells: on their surface express several receptors for chemokines: CCR1, CCR2, CCR3, CCR4, CCR5, CXCR2, and CXCR4. Ligands of these receptors CCL2 and CCL5 play an important role in mast cell recruitment and activation in the lung. There is also evidence that CXCL8 might be inhibitory of mast cells.
- Eosinophils: the migration of eosinophils into various tissues involved several chemokines of CC family: CCL11, CCL24, CCL26, CCL5, CCL7, CCL13, and CCL3. Chemokines CCL11 (eotaxin) and CCL5 (RANTES) acts through a specific receptor CCR3 on the surface of eosinophils, and eotaxin plays an essential role in the initial recruitment of eosinophils into the lesion.
- Neutrophils: are regulated primarily by CXC chemokines. An example CXCL8 (IL-8) is chemoattractant for neutrophils and also activating their metabolic and degranulation.

== Structural characteristics ==
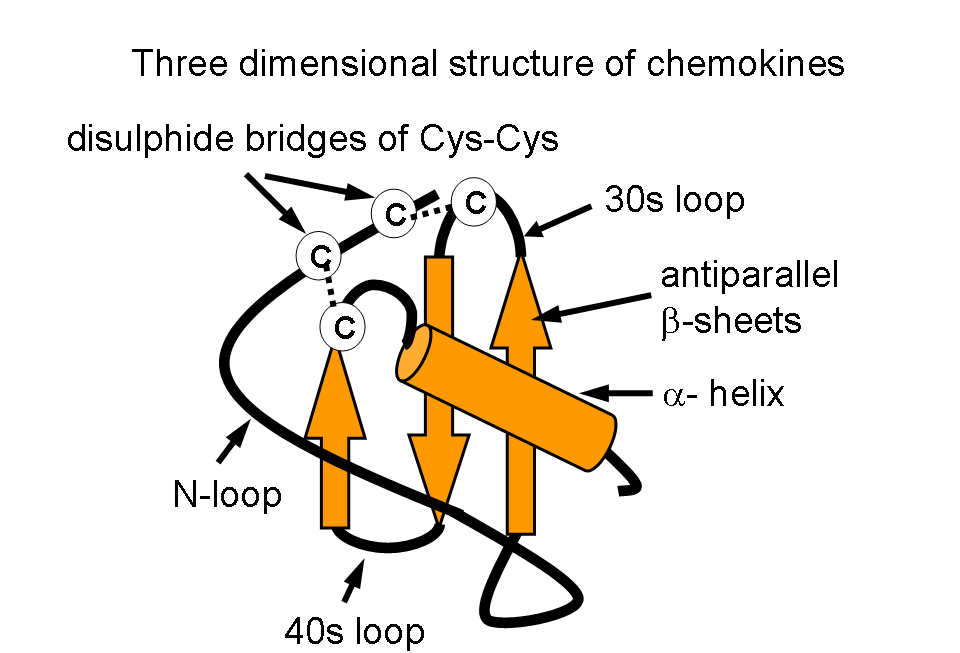
All chemokines share a typical Greek key structure that is stabilised by disulfide bonds between conserved cysteine residues.

Proteins are classified into the chemokine family based on their structural characteristics, not just their ability to attract cells. All chemokines are small, with a molecular mass of between 8 and 10 kDa, optimally designed to ensure efficient communications. They are approximately 20-50% identical to each other; that is, they share gene sequence and amino acid sequence homology. They all also possess conserved amino acids that are important for creating their 3-dimensional or tertiary structure, such as (in most cases) four cysteines that interact with each other in pairs to create a Greek key shape that is a characteristic of chemokines. Intramolecular disulfide bonds typically join the first to third, and the second to fourth cysteine residues, numbered as they appear in the protein sequence of the chemokine. Typical chemokine proteins are produced as pro-peptides, beginning with a signal peptide of approximately 20 amino acids that gets cleaved from the active (mature) portion of the molecule during the process of its secretion from the cell. The first two cysteines, in a chemokine, are situated close together near the N-terminal end of the mature protein, with the third cysteine residing in the centre of the molecule and the fourth close to the C-terminal end. A loop of approximately ten amino acids follows the first two cysteines and is known as the N-loop. This is followed by a single-turn helix, called a 3_{10}-helix, three β-strands and a C-terminal α-helix. These helices and strands are connected by turns called 30s, 40s and 50s loops; the third and fourth cysteines are located in the 30s and 50s loops.

== Types by structure ==
The four chemokine subfamilies
CC chemokines
Name	Gene	Other name(s)	Receptor	Uniprot
CCL1	Scya1	I-309, TCA-3	CCR8	
CCL2	Scya2	MCP-1	CCR2	P13500
CCL3	Scya3	MIP-1a	CCR1, CCR5	P10147
CCL4	Scya4	MIP-1β	CCR1, CCR5	P13236
CCL5	Scya5	RANTES	CCR5	P13501
CCL6	Scya6	C10, MRP-2	CCR1	P27784
CCL7	Scya7	MARC, MCP-3	CCR2	P80098
CCL8	Scya8	MCP-2	CCR1, CCR2, CCR5	P80075
CCL9/CCL10	Scya9	MRP-2, CCF18, MIP-1?	CCR1	P51670
CCL11	Scya11	Eotaxin	CCR2, CCR3, CCR5	P51671
CCL12	Scya12	MCP-5		Q62401
CCL13	Scya13	MCP-4, NCC-1, Ckβ10	CCR2, CCR3, CCR5	Q99616
CCL14	Scya14	HCC-1, MCIF, Ckβ1, NCC-2, CCL	CCR1	Q16627
CCL15	Scya15	Leukotactin-1, MIP-5, HCC-2, NCC-3	CCR1, CCR3	Q16663
CCL16	Scya16	LEC, NCC-4, LMC, Ckβ12	CCR1, CCR2, CCR5, CCR8	O15467
CCL17	Scya17	TARC, dendrokine, ABCD-2	CCR4	Q92583
CCL18	Scya18	PARC, DC-CK1, AMAC-1, Ckβ7, MIP-4		P55774
CCL19	Scya19	ELC, Exodus-3, Ckβ11	CCR7	Q99731
CCL20	Scya20	LARC, Exodus-1, Ckβ4	CCR6	P78556
CCL21	Scya21	SLC, 6Ckine, Exodus-2, Ckβ9, TCA-4	CCR7	O00585
CCL22	Scya22	MDC, DC/β-CK	CCR4	O00626
CCL23	Scya23	MPIF-1, Ckβ8, MIP-3, MPIF-1	CCR1	P55773
CCL24	Scya24	Eotaxin-2, MPIF-2, Ckβ6	CCR3	O00175
CCL25	Scya25	TECK, Ckβ15	CCR9	O15444
CCL26	Scya26	Eotaxin-3, MIP-4a, IMAC, TSC-1	CCR3	Q9Y258
CCL27	Scya27	CTACK, ILC, Eskine, PESKY, skinkine	CCR10	Q9Y4X3
CCL28	Scya28	MEC	CCR3, CCR10	Q9NRJ3
CXC chemokines
Name	Gene	Other name(s)	Receptor	Uniprot
CXCL1	Scyb1	Gro-a, GRO1, NAP-3, KC	CXCR2	P09341
CXCL2	Scyb2	Gro-β, GRO2, MIP-2a	CXCR2	P19875
CXCL3	Scyb3	Gro-?, GRO3, MIP-2β	CXCR2	P19876
CXCL4	Scyb4	PF-4	CXCR3B	P02776
CXCL5	Scyb5	ENA-78	CXCR2	P42830
CXCL6	Scyb6	GCP-2	CXCR1, CXCR2	P80162
CXCL7	Scyb7	NAP-2, CTAPIII, β-Ta, PEP		P02775
CXCL8	Scyb8	IL-8, NAP-1, MDNCF, GCP-1	CXCR1, CXCR2	P10145
CXCL9	Scyb9	MIG, CRG-10	CXCR3	Q07325
CXCL10	Scyb10	IP-10, CRG-2	CXCR3	P02778
CXCL11	Scyb11	I-TAC, β-R1, IP-9	CXCR3, CXCR7	O14625
CXCL12	Scyb12	SDF-1, PBSF	CXCR4, CXCR7	P48061
CXCL13	Scyb13	BCA-1, BLC	CXCR5	O43927
CXCL14	Scyb14	BRAK, bolekine		O95715
CXCL15	Scyb15	Lungkine, WECHE		Q9WVL7
CXCL16	Scyb16	SRPSOX	CXCR6	Q9H2A7
CXCL17	VCC-1	DMC, VCC-1		Q6UXB2
C chemokines
Name	Gene	Other name(s)	Receptor	Uniprot
XCL1	Scyc1	Lymphotactin a, SCM-1a, ATAC	XCR1	P47992
XCL2	Scyc2	Lymphotactin β, SCM-1β	XCR1	Q9UBD3
CX3C chemokines
Name	Gene	Other name(s)	Receptor	Uniprot
CX3CL1	Scyd1	Fractalkine, Neurotactin, ABCD-3	CX3CR1	P78423

Members of the chemokine family are divided into four groups depending on the spacing of their first two cysteine residues. Thus the nomenclature for chemokines is, e.g.: CCL1 for the ligand 1 of the CC-family of chemokines, and CCR1 for its respective receptor.

=== CC chemokines ===
The CC chemokine (or β-chemokine) proteins have two adjacent cysteines (amino acids), near their amino terminus. There have been at least 27 distinct members of this subgroup reported for mammals, called CC chemokine ligands (CCL)-1 to -28; CCL10 is the same as CCL9. Chemokines of this subfamily usually contain four cysteines (C4-CC chemokines), but a small number of CC chemokines possess six cysteines (C6-CC chemokines). C6-CC chemokines include CCL1, CCL15, CCL21, CCL23 and CCL28. CC chemokines induce the migration of monocytes and other cell types such as NK cells and dendritic cells.

Examples of CC chemokine include monocyte chemoattractant protein-1 (MCP-1 or CCL2) which induces monocytes to leave the bloodstream and enter the surrounding tissue to become tissue macrophages.

CCL5 (or RANTES) attracts cells such as T cells, eosinophils and basophils that express the receptor CCR5.

Increased CCL11 levels in blood plasma are associated with aging (and reduced neurogenesis) in mice and humans.

=== CXC chemokines ===
The two N-terminal cysteines of CXC chemokines (or α-chemokines) are separated by one amino acid, represented in this name with an "X". There have been 17 different CXC chemokines described in mammals, that are subdivided into two categories, those with a specific amino acid sequence (or motif) of glutamic acid-leucine-arginine (or ELR for short) immediately before the first cysteine of the CXC motif (ELR-positive), and those without an ELR motif (ELR-negative). ELR-positive CXC chemokines specifically induce the migration of neutrophils, and interact with chemokine receptors CXCR1 and CXCR2. An example of an ELR-positive CXC chemokine is interleukin-8 (IL-8), which induces neutrophils to leave the bloodstream and enter into the surrounding tissue. Other CXC chemokines that lack the ELR motif, such as CXCL13, tend to be chemoattractant for lymphocytes. CXC chemokines bind to CXC chemokine receptors, of which seven have been discovered to date, designated CXCR1-7.

=== C chemokines ===
The third group of chemokines is known as the C chemokines (or γ chemokines), and is unlike all other chemokines in that it has only two cysteines; one N-terminal cysteine and one cysteine downstream. Two chemokines have been described for this subgroup and are called XCL1 (lymphotactin-α) and XCL2 (lymphotactin-β).

=== CX_{3}C chemokines ===
A fourth group has also been discovered and members have three amino acids between the two cysteines and is termed CX_{3}C chemokine (or d-chemokines). The only CX_{3}C chemokine discovered to date is called fractalkine (or CX_{3}CL1). It is both secreted and tethered to the surface of the cell that expresses it, thereby serving as both a chemoattractant and as an adhesion molecule.

== Receptors ==
Chemokine receptors are G protein-coupled receptors containing 7 transmembrane domains that are found on the surface of leukocytes. Approximately 19 different chemokine receptors have been characterized to date, which are divided into four families depending on the type of chemokine they bind; CXCR that bind CXC chemokines, CCR that bind CC chemokines, CX3CR1 that binds the sole CX3C chemokine (CX3CL1), and XCR1 that binds the two XC chemokines (XCL1 and XCL2). They share many structural features; they are similar in size (with about 350 amino acids), have a short, acidic N-terminal end, seven helical transmembrane domains with three intracellular and three extracellular hydrophilic loops, and an intracellular C-terminus containing serine and threonine residues important for receptor regulation. The first two extracellular loops of chemokine receptors each has a conserved cysteine residue that allow formation of a disulfide bridge between these loops. G proteins are coupled to the C-terminal end of the chemokine receptor to allow intracellular signaling after receptor activation, while the N-terminal domain of the chemokine receptor determines ligand binding specificity.

=== Signal transduction ===
Chemokine receptors associate with G-proteins to transmit cell signals following ligand binding. Activation of G proteins, by chemokine receptors, causes the subsequent activation of an enzyme known as phospholipase C (PLC). PLC cleaves a molecule called phosphatidylinositol (4,5)-bisphosphate into two second messenger molecules known as Inositol triphosphate (IP_{3}) and diacylglycerol (DAG) that trigger intracellular signaling events; DAG activates another enzyme called protein kinase C (PKC), and IP_{3} triggers the release of calcium from intracellular stores. These events promote many signaling cascades (such as the MAP kinase pathway) that generate responses like chemotaxis, degranulation, release of superoxide anions and changes in the avidity of cell adhesion molecules called integrins within the cell harbouring the chemokine receptor.

== Infection control ==
The discovery that the β chemokines RANTES, MIP (macrophage inflammatory proteins) 1α and 1β (now known as CCL5, CCL3 and CCL4 respectively) suppress HIV-1 provided the initial connection and indicated that these molecules might control infection as part of immune responses in vivo, and that sustained delivery of such inhibitors have the capacity of long-term infection control. The association of chemokine production with antigen-induced proliferative responses, more favorable clinical status in HIV infection, as well as with an uninfected status in subjects at risk for infection suggests a positive role for these molecules in controlling the natural course of HIV infection.

== See also ==
- Paracrine signalling
