= CXCL9 =

Mammalian protein found in humans

Identifiers
- Aliases: CXCL9, CMK, Humig, MIG, SCYB9, crg-10, C-X-C motif chemokine ligand 9
- External IDs: OMIM: 601704; MGI: 1352449; GeneCards: CXCL9

Gene location (Human)
Chr.	Chromosome 4 (human)
Band	4q21.1	Start	76,001,275 bp
Band	4q21.1	End	76,007,509 bp

Gene location (Mouse)
Chr.	Chromosome 5 (mouse)
Band	5 E2|5 46.51 cM	Start	92,469,206 bp
Band	5 E2|5 46.51 cM	End	92,475,938 bp
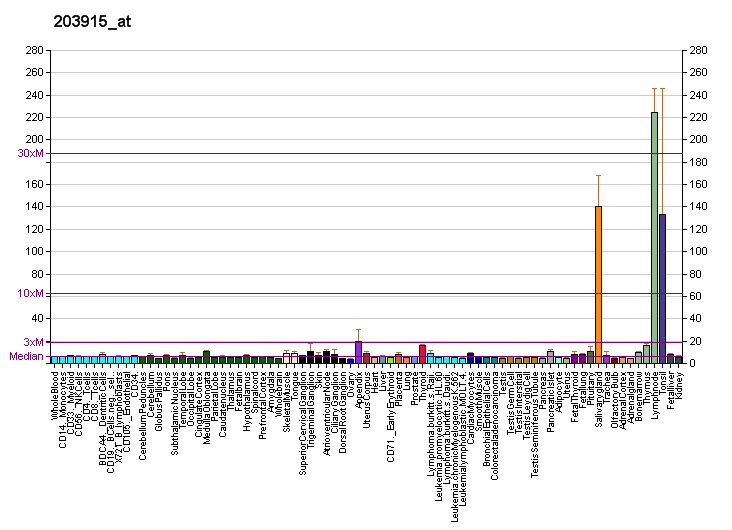
RNA expression pattern
Bgee	Human / Mouse (ortholog); Top expressed in: appendix; lymph node; epithelium of nasopharynx; superficial temporal artery; rectum; olfactory zone of nasal mucosa; palpebral conjunctiva; testicle; gallbladder; parietal pleura / Top expressed in: subcutaneous adipose tissue; mesenteric lymph nodes; submandibular gland; white adipose tissue; spleen; left lobe of liver; tunica adventitia of aorta; brown adipose tissue; jejunum; mammary gland; More reference expression data
BioGPS	More reference expression data
Gene ontology
Molecular function	cytokine activity; CXCR3 chemokine receptor binding; chemokine activity; protein binding
Cellular component	extracellular region; external side of plasma membrane; extracellular space; intracellular anatomical structure
Biological process	G protein-coupled receptor signaling pathway; chemokine-mediated signaling pathway; cell-cell signaling; positive regulation of release of sequestered calcium ion into cytosol; positive regulation of cAMP-mediated signaling; chemotaxis; positive regulation of leukocyte chemotaxis; cellular defense response; positive regulation of myoblast fusion; response to lipopolysaccharide; regulation of cell population proliferation; positive regulation of myoblast differentiation; defense response to virus; immune response; signal transduction; defense response; inflammatory response; T cell chemotaxis; antimicrobial humoral immune response mediated by antimicrobial peptide; regulation of signaling receptor activity; adenylate cyclase-activating G protein-coupled receptor signaling pathway; response to bacterium; neutrophil chemotaxis; leukocyte chemotaxis; cellular response to lipopolysaccharide
Sources:Amigo / QuickGO
Orthologs
Databases	NCBI: entry; OMA: entry
Species	Human	Mouse
Entrez	4283	17329
Ensembl	ENSG00000138755	ENSMUSG00000029417
UniProt	Q07325	P18340
RefSeq (mRNA)	NM_002416	NM_008599
RefSeq (protein)	NP_002407	NP_032625
Location (UCSC)	Chr 4: 76 – 76.01 Mb	Chr 5: 92.47 – 92.48 Mb
PubMed search
- Wikidata
View/Edit Human	View/Edit Mouse

Chemokine (C-X-C motif) ligand 9 (CXCL9) is a small cytokine belonging to the CXC chemokine family that is also known as monokine induced by gamma interferon (MIG). CXCL9 is one of the chemokines that play a role chemotaxis induction, promote differentiation and multiplication of leukocytes, and cause tissue extravasation.

It is closely related to CXCL10 and CXCL11, whose genes are located near that of CXCL9 on human chromosome 4. CXCL9, CXCL10 and CXCL11 all elicit their chemotactic functions by interacting with the chemokine receptor CXCR3.

== Structure ==
Chemokine (C-X-C motif) ligand 9 (CXCL9) exhibits the classic structure of CXC chemokines, characterized by a short and flexible N-terminal region, a well-ordered core stabilized by two disulfide bonds, three antiparallel beta-strands, and a C-terminal alpha-helix. This conserved tertiary structure provides both stability and the necessary conformational flexibility at the N- and C-termini, enabling effective interactions with its receptor, CXCR3, and facilitating signal transduction essential for immune cell migration and activation. The structural core is highly conserved among CXC chemokines, while variations in the loop regions contribute to differences in receptor binding and functional specificity.

== Function ==
The CXCL9/CXCR3 receptor regulates immune cell migration, differentiation, and activation. Immune reactivity occurs through recruitment of immune cells, such as cytotoxic lymphocytes (CTLs), natural killer (NK) cells, NKT cells, and macrophages. Th1 polarization also activates the immune cells in response to IFN-γ. Tumor-infiltrating lymphocytes are a key for clinical outcomes and prediction of the response to checkpoint inhibitors. In vivo studies suggest the axis plays a tumorigenic role by increasing tumor proliferation and metastasis. CXCL9 predominantly mediates lymphocytic infiltration to the focal sites and suppresses tumor growth.

=== Immune modulation ===
In immune cell differentiation, several reports indicate that CXCL9 promotes T helper 1 (Th1) polarization through CXCR3. An in vivo model by Zohar et al. demonstrated that CXCL9 increased the transcription of T-bet and RORγ, leading to the polarization of Foxp3^{−} type 1 regulatory (Tr1) cells or Th17 cells from naïve T cells via STAT1, STAT4, and STAT5 phosphorylation.

Several studies have shown that tumor-associated macrophages (TAMs) exert modulatory effects in the tumor microenvironment (TME), with the CXCL9/CXCR3 axis influencing TAM polarization. TAMs can exhibit opposing effects: M1 macrophages promote anti-tumor activity, while M2 macrophages support tumor progression. Oghumu et al. found that mice deficient in CXCR3 displayed increased IL-4 production and M2 polarization in a murine breast cancer model, accompanied by reduced innate and immune cell-mediated anti-tumor responses.

Regarding immune cell activation, CXCL9 stimulates Th1 polarization and activation, leading to the production of IFN-γ, TNF-α, and IL-2. This enhances anti-tumor immunity by activating cytotoxic T lymphocytes (CTLs), NK cells, and macrophages. Additionally, the IFN-γ-dependent immune activation loop further promotes CXCL9 release. Immune cells such as Th1 cells, CTLs, NK cells, and NKT cells exert anti-tumor effects against cancer cells via paracrine CXCL9/CXCR3 signaling in tumor models. In contrast, autocrine CXCL9/CXCR3 signaling in cancer cells has been implicated in promoting cancer cell proliferation, angiogenesis, and metastasis.

=== Immune checkpoint regulation ===
The relationship between the CXCL9/CXCR3 axis and the PD-L1/PD-1 pathway is important in immune regulation. Programmed cell death protein 1 (PD-1) expression is increased on T cells within the tumor site compared to T cells in peripheral blood. Anti-PD-1 therapy can inhibit "immune escape" and enhance immune activation. Peng et al. demonstrated that anti-PD-1 therapy not only enhanced T cell-mediated tumor regression but also increased the expression of IFN-γ, though not CXCL9, in bone marrow-derived cells. Blockade of the PD-L1/PD-1 axis in T cells may induce a positive feedback loop at the tumor site through the CXCL9/CXCR3 axis. Additionally, treatment with an anti-CTLA4 antibody led to a significant upregulation of this axis in pretreatment melanoma lesions from patients who exhibited a favorable clinical response to ipilimumab.

== Clinical significance ==
=== Biomarkers ===
CXCL9, -10, -11 have proven to be valid biomarkers for the development of heart failure and left ventricular dysfunction, suggesting an underlining pathophysiological relation between levels of these chemokines and the development of adverse cardiac remodeling.

This chemokine has also been associated as a biomarker for diagnosing Q fever infections.

=== Melanoma ===
CXCL9 has also been identified as candidate biomarker of adoptive T cell transfer therapy in metastatic melanoma. CXCL9/CXCR3 in TME and immune response plays a critical role in immune activation through paracrine signaling, impacting efficacy of cancer treatments.

== Interactions ==
CXCL9 has been shown to interact with CXCR3.
