= CXCL6 =

Mammalian protein found in humans

Identifiers
- Aliases: CXCL6, CKA-3, GCP-2, GCP2, SCYB6, C-X-C motif chemokine ligand 6
- External IDs: OMIM: 138965; MGI: 1096868; GeneCards: CXCL6

Gene location (Human)
| Chr. | Chromosome 4 (human) |
| Band | 4q13.3 | Start | 73,836,640 bp |
| Band | 4q13.3 | End | 73,849,064 bp |

Gene location (Mouse)
| Chr. | Chromosome 5 (mouse) |
| Band | 5 E1|5 44.78 cM | Start | 90,907,219 bp |
| Band | 5 E1|5 44.78 cM | End | 90,909,483 bp |
RNA expression pattern
| Bgee | Human / Mouse (ortholog); Top expressed in: bronchial epithelial cell; palpebral conjunctiva; spleen; olfactory zone of nasal mucosa; cartilage tissue; islet of Langerhans; beta cell; parietal pleura; jejunal mucosa; sperm / Top expressed in: right lobe of liver; cervix; endothelial cell of lymphatic vessel; trachea; respiratory epithelium; olfactory epithelium; mandibular molars; embryo; embryo; conjunctival fornix; More reference expression data |
| BioGPS | n/a |
Gene ontology
| Molecular function | cytokine activity; CXCR chemokine receptor binding; heparin binding; chemokine activity; protein binding |
| Cellular component | extracellular region; extracellular space |
| Biological process | chemotaxis; cell-cell signaling; chemokine-mediated signaling pathway; regulation of cell population proliferation; defense response to bacterium; signal transduction; neutrophil mediated immunity; defense response; positive regulation of neutrophil chemotaxis; neutrophil chemotaxis; neutrophil activation; antimicrobial humoral immune response mediated by antimicrobial peptide; cellular response to lipopolysaccharide; inflammatory response; immune response; regulation of signaling receptor activity; G protein-coupled receptor signaling pathway; leukocyte homeostasis; leukocyte chemotaxis; response to lipopolysaccharide; regulation of chemokine production; regulation of neutrophil mediated killing of gram-negative bacterium |
Sources:Amigo / QuickGO
Orthologs
| Databases | NCBI: entry; OMA: entry |
| Species | Human | Mouse |
| Entrez | 6372 | 20311 |
| Ensembl | ENSG00000124875 | ENSMUSG00000029371 |
| UniProt | P80162 | P50228 |
| RefSeq (mRNA) | NM_002993 | NM_009141 |
| RefSeq (protein) | NP_002984 | NP_033167 |
| Location (UCSC) | Chr 4: 73.84 – 73.85 Mb | Chr 5: 90.91 – 90.91 Mb |
| PubMed search |
- Wikidata
| View/Edit Human | View/Edit Mouse |

chemokine (C-X-C motif) ligand 6 (granulocyte chemotactic protein 2)

Identifiers
- Symbol: CXCL6
- Alt. symbols: SCYB6, GCP-2, CKA-3
- NCBI gene: 6372
- HGNC: 10643
- OMIM: 138965
- RefSeq: NM_002993
- UniProt: P80162

Other data
- Locus: Chr. 4 q21
Search for
- Structures: Swiss-model
- Domains: InterPro

Chemokine (C-X-C motif) ligand 6 (CXCL6) is a small cytokine belonging to the CXC chemokine family that is also known as granulocyte chemotactic protein 2 (GCP-2). As its former name suggests, CXCL6 is a chemoattractant for neutrophilic granulocytes. It elicits its chemotactic effects by interacting with the chemokine receptors CXCR1 and CXCR2. The gene for CXCL6 is located on human chromosome 4 in a cluster with other CXC chemokine genes.
