= CCL9 =

Mammalian protein found in mice

Ccl9

Identifiers
- Aliases: chemokine (C-C motif) ligand 9CCF18MRP-2Scya10Scya9
- External IDs: GeneCards:

Gene location (Human)
| Chr. | Chromosome 11 (human) |
| Band | 11 C|11 50.81 cM | Start | 83,463,745 bp |
| Band | 11 C|11 50.81 cM | End | 83,469,462 bp |
RNA expression pattern
| Bgee | Human / Mouse (ortholog); Top expressed in: stroma of bone marrow; lacrimal gland; crypt of lieberkuhn of small intestine; left lobe of liver; intercostal muscle; white adipose tissue; subcutaneous adipose tissue; Paneth cell; ankle joint; blood / n/a; More reference expression data |
| BioGPS | n/a |
Gene ontology
| Molecular function | CCR chemokine receptor binding; chemokine activity; cytokine activity |
| Cellular component | extracellular region; extracellular space |
| Biological process | neutrophil chemotaxis; negative regulation of myoblast differentiation; cellular response to tumor necrosis factor; positive regulation of ERK1 and ERK2 cascade; inflammatory response; positive regulation of GTPase activity; G protein-coupled receptor signaling pathway; lymphocyte chemotaxis; monocyte chemotaxis; cellular response to interferon-gamma; cellular response to interleukin-1; immune response; chemokine-mediated signaling pathway; chemotaxis; regulation of signaling receptor activity; eosinophil chemotaxis |
Sources:Amigo / QuickGO
Orthologs
| Databases | NCBI: entry; OMA: entry |
| Species | Human | Mouse |
| Entrez | 20308 | n/a |
| Ensembl | ENSMUSG00000019122 | n/a |
| UniProt | P51670 | n/a |
| RefSeq (mRNA) | NM_011338 | n/a |
| RefSeq (protein) | NP_035468 | n/a |
| Location (UCSC) | Chr 11: 83.46 – 83.47 Mb | n/a |
| PubMed search | | n/a |
- Wikidata
| View/Edit Human |

Chemokine (C-C motif) ligand 9 (CCL9) is a small cytokine belonging to the CC chemokine family. It is also called macrophage inflammatory protein-1 gamma (MIP-1γ), macrophage inflammatory protein-related protein-2 (MRP-2) and CCF18, that has been described in rodents. CCL9 has also been previously designated CCL10, although this name is no longer in use. It is secreted by follicle-associated epithelium (FAE) such as that found around Peyer's patches, and attracts dendritic cells that possess the cell surface molecule CD11b and the chemokine receptor CCR1. CCL9 can activate osteoclasts through its receptor CCR1 (the most abundant chemokine receptor found on osteoclasts) suggesting an important role for CCL9 in bone resorption. CCL9 is constitutively expressed in macrophages and myeloid cells. The gene for CCL9 is located on chromosome 11 in mice.

CCL9 is a chemokine involved in the process of signaling an antileukemic response and is a potential form of immunotherapy for chronic myelogenous leukemia (CML). CML is a type of cancer in which the bone marrow produces too many red blood cells. This is caused by chromosomal translocation, a mutation in which the abnormal gene BCR-ABL, is turned into a CML cell. CML starts off as a myeloproliferative for example in sickle cell anemia or extreme granulocytosis but if left untreated, it could transform into an acute form of leukemia. In order to treat CML, alpha and beta interferons (INFs) are used to regulate the process of binding the protein ICSBP to the gene BCR-ABL. CCL9 was proved to be a gene induced by ICSBP and IFN alpha and also a requirement in the expression of ICSBP in BCR-ABL transformed cells to generate an anti-leukemic immune protection via experimentation. CCL6 and CCL9 were overexpressed in BaF3 cells and injected with BCR-ABL into syngeneic mice. Although the mice still developed leukemia, it delayed the advancement of the disease by several weeks proving that CCL6 and CCL9 contribute to the creation of an anti-leukemic response within infected cells.
