= CXCL11 =

Protein-coding gene in humans

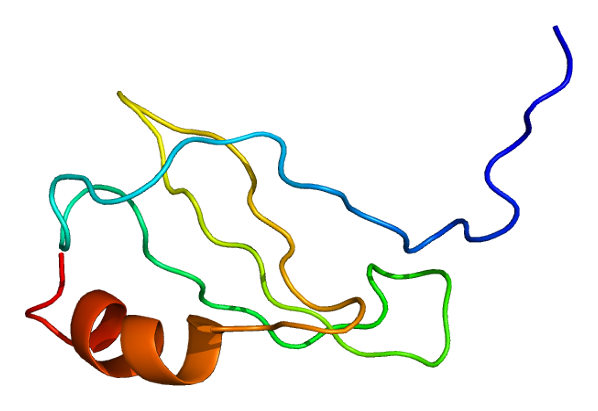

Identifiers
- Aliases: CXCL11, H174, I-TAC, IP-9, IP9, SCYB11, SCYB9B, b-R1, C-X-C motif chemokine ligand 11
- External IDs: OMIM: 604852; MGI: 1860203; GeneCards: CXCL11
Available structures
PDB	Ortholog search: PDBe RCSB
PDB	List of PDB id codes 1RJT

Gene location (Human)
Chr.	Chromosome 4 (human)
Band	4q21.1	Start	76,033,682 bp
Band	4q21.1	End	76,041,415 bp
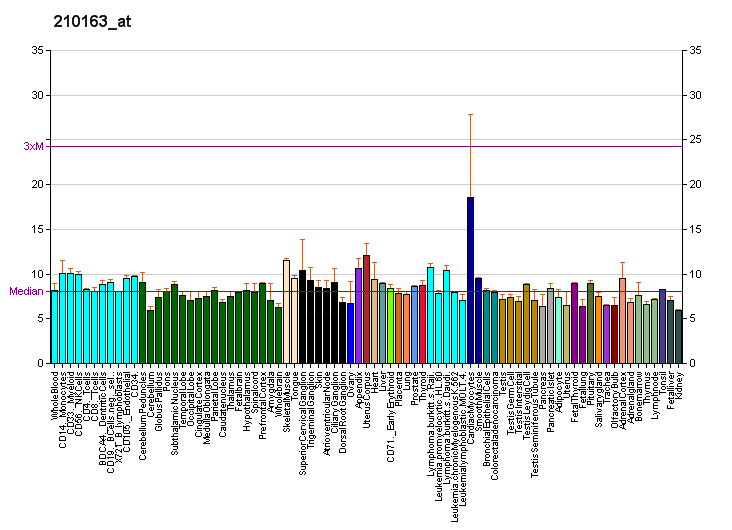

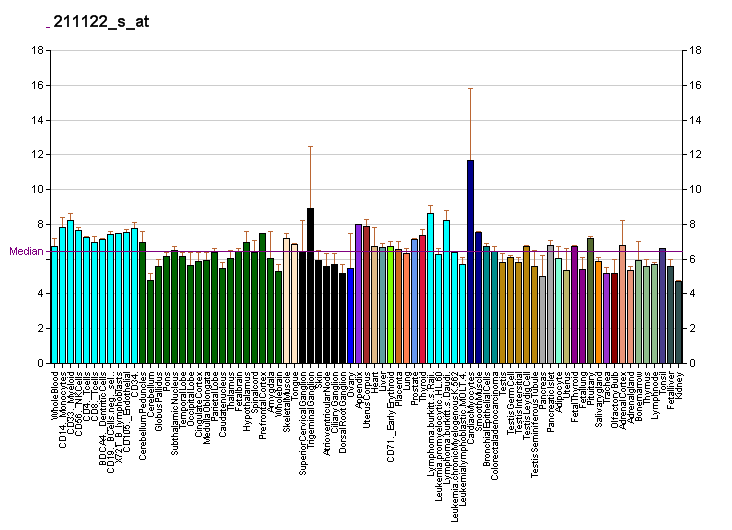
RNA expression pattern
Bgee	Human / Mouse (ortholog); Top expressed in: testicle; appendix; olfactory zone of nasal mucosa; body of pancreas; lymph node; rectum; smooth muscle tissue; islet of Langerhans; monocyte; Achilles tendon / n/a; More reference expression data
BioGPS	More reference expression data
Gene ontology
Molecular function	chemokine activity; cytokine activity; heparin binding; protein binding; CXCR3 chemokine receptor binding
Cellular component	extracellular region; extracellular space; intracellular anatomical structure
Biological process	chemotaxis; positive regulation of leukocyte chemotaxis; T cell chemotaxis; chemokine-mediated signaling pathway; response to lipopolysaccharide; cell-cell signaling; positive regulation of release of sequestered calcium ion into cytosol; positive regulation of cAMP-mediated signaling; regulation of cell population proliferation; immune response; signal transduction; defense response; inflammatory response; antimicrobial humoral immune response mediated by antimicrobial peptide; regulation of signaling receptor activity; G protein-coupled receptor signaling pathway; adenylate cyclase-activating G protein-coupled receptor signaling pathway; neutrophil chemotaxis; leukocyte chemotaxis; cellular response to lipopolysaccharide
Sources:Amigo / QuickGO
Orthologs
Databases	NCBI: entry; OMA: entry
Species	Human	Mouse
Entrez	6373	56066
Ensembl	ENSG00000169248	ENSMUSG00000060183
UniProt	O14625	Q9JHH5
RefSeq (mRNA)	NM_005409; NM_001302123	NM_019494
RefSeq (protein)	NP_001289052; NP_005400	NP_062367
Location (UCSC)	Chr 4: 76.03 – 76.04 Mb	n/a
PubMed search
- Wikidata
View/Edit Human	View/Edit Mouse

C-X-C motif chemokine 11 (CXCL11) is a protein that in humans is encoded by the CXCL11 gene.

C-X-C motif chemokine 11 is a small cytokine belonging to the CXC chemokine family that is also called Interferon-inducible T-cell alpha chemoattractant (I-TAC) and Interferon-gamma-inducible protein 9 (IP-9). It is highly expressed in peripheral blood leukocytes, pancreas and liver, with moderate levels in thymus, spleen and lung and low expression levels were in small intestine, placenta and prostate.

Gene expression of CXCL11 is strongly induced by IFN-γ and IFN-β, and weakly induced by IFN-α. This chemokine elicits its effects on its target cells by interacting with the cell surface chemokine receptor CXCR3, with a higher affinity than do the other ligands for this receptor, CXCL9 and CXCL10. CXCL11 is chemotactic for activated T cells. Its gene is located on human chromosome 4 along with many other members of the CXC chemokine family.

== Biomarkers ==
CXCL9, -10, -11 have proven to be valid biomarkers for the development of heart failure and left ventricular dysfunction, suggesting an underlining pathophysiological relation between levels of these chemokines and the development of adverse cardiac remodeling.
