= CXCL15 =

Mammalian protein found in mice

Cxcl15

Identifiers
- Aliases: chemokine (C-X-C motif) ligand 15Il8Scyb15lungkineweche
- External IDs: GeneCards:

Gene location (Human)
Chr.	Chromosome 5 (human)
Band	5 E1|5 44.78 cM	Start	90,942,393 bp
Band	5 E1|5 44.78 cM	End	90,950,926 bp
RNA expression pattern
Bgee	Human / Mouse (ortholog); Top expressed in: left lung lobe; right lung lobe; trachea; cervix; sexually immature organism; mammary gland; external carotid artery; lobe of prostate; genital tubercle; nucleus accumbens / n/a; More reference expression data
BioGPS	n/a
Gene ontology
Molecular function	chemokine activity; cytokine activity; CXCR3 chemokine receptor binding
Cellular component	extracellular region; extracellular space
Biological process	chemotaxis; chemokine-mediated signaling pathway; G protein-coupled receptor signaling pathway; response to lipopolysaccharide; inflammatory response; regulation of cell population proliferation; immune response; neutrophil chemotaxis; positive regulation of leukocyte chemotaxis; defense response; T cell chemotaxis; regulation of signaling receptor activity; hemopoiesis; leukocyte chemotaxis; antimicrobial humoral immune response mediated by antimicrobial peptide; cellular response to lipopolysaccharide
Sources:Amigo / QuickGO
Orthologs
Databases	NCBI: entry; OMA: entry
Species	Human	Mouse
Entrez	20309	n/a
Ensembl	ENSMUSG00000029375	n/a
UniProt	Q9WVL7	n/a
RefSeq (mRNA)	NM_011339	n/a
RefSeq (protein)	NP_035469	n/a
Location (UCSC)	Chr 5: 90.94 – 90.95 Mb	n/a
PubMed search		n/a
- Wikidata
View/Edit Human

Chemokine (C-X-C motif) ligand 15 (CXCL15) is a small cytokine belonging to the CXC chemokine family that has been described in the mouse. This chemokine is also known under the name lungkine. CXCL15 is an ELR+ CXC chemokine (it contains the amino acid sequence E-L-R immediately before its CXC motif) that recruits neutrophils during inflammation of the lungs. It is highly abundant in epithelial cells of the lung, and can also be found in other mucosal organs such as the urogenital and gastrointestinal tracts, and in endocrine organs like the adrenal gland. The gene for CXCL15 is found on mouse chromosome 5.
