= CCL2 =

Protein found in humans

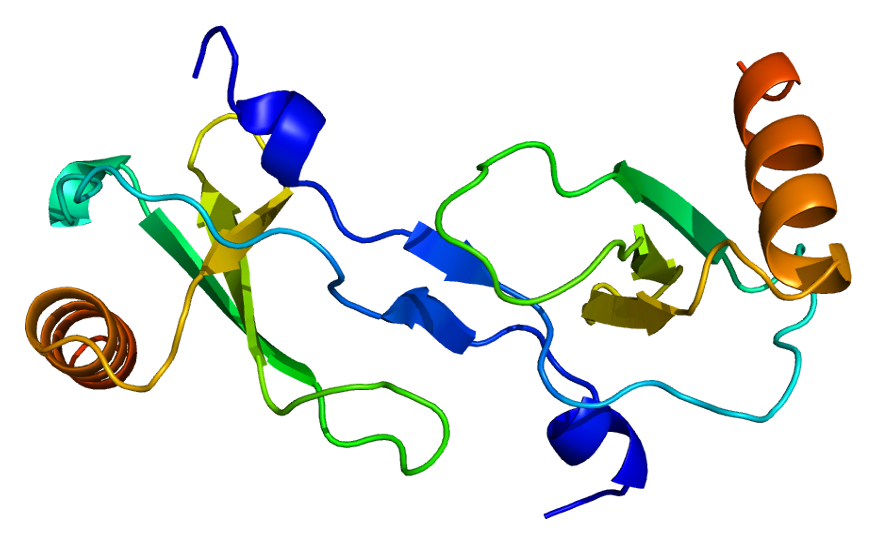

Identifiers
- Aliases: CCL2, GDCF-2, HC11, HSMCR30, MCAF, MCP-1, MCP1, SCYA2, SMC-CF, C-C motif chemokine ligand 2
- External IDs: OMIM: 158105; MGI: 108224; GeneCards: CCL2
Available structures
PDB	Ortholog search: PDBe RCSB
PDB	List of PDB id codes 1DOK, 1DOL, 1DOM, 1DON, 1ML0, 2BDN, 2NZ1, 4DN4, 3IFD, 4R8I, 4ZK9

Gene location (Human)
Chr.	Chromosome 17 (human)
Band	17q12	Start	34,255,274 bp
Band	17q12	End	34,257,208 bp

Gene location (Mouse)
Chr.	Chromosome 11 (mouse)
Band	11 C|11 49.9 cM	Start	81,992,671 bp
Band	11 C|11 49.9 cM	End	81,994,226 bp
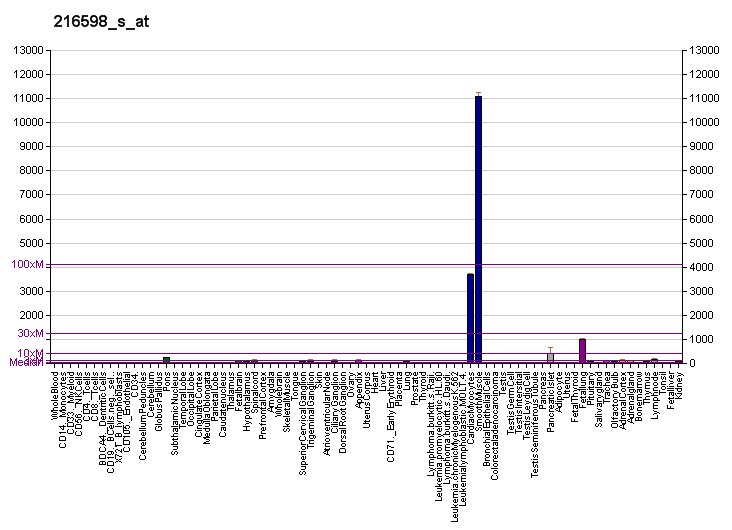
RNA expression pattern
Bgee	Human / Mouse (ortholog); Top expressed in: vena cava; gallbladder; islet of Langerhans; gastric mucosa; beta cell; rectum; left uterine tube; smooth muscle tissue; saphenous vein; epithelium of colon / Top expressed in: cervix; right kidney; embryo; thymus; subcutaneous adipose tissue; aortic valve; stroma of bone marrow; dermis; efferent ductule; white adipose tissue; More reference expression data
BioGPS	More reference expression data
Gene ontology
Molecular function	signaling receptor binding; protein kinase activity; cytokine activity; protein binding; chemokine activity; CCR2 chemokine receptor binding; CCR chemokine receptor binding
Cellular component	extracellular region; extracellular space; intracellular anatomical structure
Biological process	negative regulation of neuron apoptotic process; viral genome replication; negative regulation of natural killer cell chemotaxis; protein phosphorylation; cell surface receptor signaling pathway; humoral immune response; angiogenesis; positive regulation of ERK1 and ERK2 cascade; animal organ morphogenesis; cellular homeostasis; cellular response to fibroblast growth factor stimulus; positive regulation of GTPase activity; inflammatory response; G protein-coupled receptor signaling pathway; monocyte chemotaxis; G protein-coupled receptor signaling pathway, coupled to cyclic nucleotide second messenger; cellular response to organic cyclic compound; chemotaxis; cell adhesion; immune response; regulation of cell shape; lipopolysaccharide-mediated signaling pathway; receptor signaling pathway via JAK-STAT; response to bacterium; protein kinase B signaling; astrocyte cell migration; negative regulation of glial cell apoptotic process; PERK-mediated unfolded protein response; MAPK cascade; positive regulation of calcium ion import; cytoskeleton organization; signal transduction; regulation of signaling receptor activity; neutrophil chemotaxis; helper T cell extravasation; macrophage chemotaxis; positive regulation of T cell activation; positive regulation of nitric-oxide synthase biosynthetic process; chemokine-mediated signaling pathway; cellular response to lipopolysaccharide; cellular response to interferon-gamma; cellular response to interleukin-1; cellular response to tumor necrosis factor; positive regulation of apoptotic cell clearance; cytokine-mediated signaling pathway; negative regulation of vascular endothelial cell proliferation; negative regulation of G1/S transition of mitotic cell cycle; positive regulation of endothelial cell apoptotic process; eosinophil chemotaxis; lymphocyte chemotaxis; sensory perception of pain; positive regulation of synaptic transmission, glutamatergic; positive regulation of NMDA glutamate receptor activity
Sources:Amigo / QuickGO
Orthologs
Databases	NCBI: entry; OMA: entry
Species	Human	Mouse
Entrez	6347	20293
Ensembl	ENSG00000108691	ENSMUSG00000035352
UniProt	P13500	Q62401
RefSeq (mRNA)	NM_002982	NM_011331
RefSeq (protein)	NP_002973	NP_035461
Location (UCSC)	Chr 17: 34.26 – 34.26 Mb	Chr 11: 81.99 – 81.99 Mb
PubMed search
- Wikidata
View/Edit Human	View/Edit Mouse

The chemokine (C-C motif) ligand 2 (CCL2) is also referred to as monocyte chemoattractant protein 1 (MCP1) and small inducible cytokine A2. CCL2 is a small cytokine that belongs to the CC chemokine family. CCL2 tightly regulates cellular mechanics and thereby recruits monocytes, memory T cells, and dendritic cells to the sites of inflammation produced by either tissue injury or infection.

== Genomics ==
In the human genome, CCL2 and many other CC chemokines are located on chromosome 17 (17q11.2-q21.1). The gene span is 1,927 bases and the CCL2 gene resides on the Watson (plus) strand. The CCL2 gene has three exons and two introns. The CCL2 protein precursor contains a signal peptide of 23 amino acids. In turn, the mature CCL2 is 76 amino acids long. The CCL2 predicted weight is 11.025 kilodaltons (kDa).

== Population genetics ==
In humans, the levels of CCL2 can vary considerably. In the white people of European descent, the multivariable-adjusted heritability of CCL2 concentrations is as much as 0.37 in the blood plasma and 0.44 - in the serum.

== Molecular biology ==
CCL2 is a monomeric polypeptide, with a molecular weight of approximately 13-15 kDa depending on levels of glycosylation. CCL2 is anchored in the plasma membrane of endothelial cells by glycosaminoglycan side chains of proteoglycans. CCL2 is primarily secreted by monocytes, macrophages and dendritic cells. Platelet derived growth factor is a major inducer of CCL2 gene.

CCR2 and CCR4 are two cell surface receptors that bind CCL2.

CCL2 exhibits a chemotactic activity for monocytes and basophils. However, it does not attract neutrophils or eosinophils. After deletion of the N-terminal residue, CCL2 loses its attractivity for basophils and becomes a chemoattractant of eosinophils. Basophils and mast cells that are treated with CCL2 release their granules to the intercellular space. This effect can be also potentiated by a pre-treatment with IL-3 or even by other cytokines. CCL2 augments monocyte anti-tumor activity and it is essential for formation of granulomas. CCL2 protein become a CCR2 antagonist when it is cleaved by metalloproteinase MMP-12.

CCL2 can be found at the sites of tooth eruption and bone degradation. In the bone, CCL2 is expressed by mature osteoclasts and osteoblasts and it is under control of nuclear factor κB (NFκB). In the human osteoclasts, CCL2 and RANTES (regulated on activation normal T cell expressed and secreted). Both MCP-1 and RANTES induce formation of TRAP-positive, multinuclear cells from M-CSF-treated monocytes in the absence of RANKL, but produced osteoclasts that lacked cathepsin K expression and resorptive capacity. It is proposed that CCL2 and RANTES act as autocrine loop in human osteoclast differentiation.

The CCL2 chemokine is also expressed by neurons, astrocytes and microglia. The expression of CCL2 in neurons is mainly found in the cerebral cortex, globus pallidus, hippocampus, paraventricular and supraoptic hypothalamic nuclei, lateral hypothalamus, substantia nigra, facial nuclei, motor and spinal trigeminal nuclei, gigantocellular reticular nucleus and in Purkinje cells in the cerebellum.

== Clinical importance ==
CCL2 is implicated in pathogeneses of several diseases characterized by monocytic infiltrates, such as psoriasis, rheumatoid arthritis and atherosclerosis.

Administration of anti-CCL2 antibodies in a model of glomerulonephritis reduces infiltration of macrophages and T cells, reduces crescent formation, as well as scarring and renal impairment.

CCL2 is involved in the neuroinflammatory processes that takes place in the various diseases of the central nervous system (CNS), which are characterized by neuronal degeneration. CCL2 expression in glial cells is increased in epilepsy, brain ischemia Alzheimer's disease experimental autoimmune encephalomyelitis (EAE), and traumatic brain injury.

Hypomethylation of CpG sites within the CCL2 promoter region is affected by high levels of blood glucose and TG, which increase CCL2 levels in the blood serum. The latter plays an important role in the vascular complications of type 2 diabetes.

CCL2 induces amylin expression through ERK1/ERK2/JNK-AP1 and NF-κB related signaling pathways independent of CCR2. Amylin upregulation by CCL2 contributes to the elevation of the plasma amylin and insulin resistance in obesity.

Adipocytes secrete various adipokines that may be involved in the negative cross-talk between adipose tissue and skeletal muscle. CCL2 impairs insulin signaling in skeletal muscle cells via ERK1/2 activation at doses similar to its physiological plasma concentrations (200 pg/mL), but does not involve activation of the NF-κB pathway. CCL2 significantly reduced insulin-stimulated glucose uptake in myocytes. CCL2 may represent a molecular link in the negative cross-talk between adipose tissue and skeletal muscle assigning a completely novel important role to CCL2 besides inflammation.

Incubation of HL-1 cardiomyocytes and human myocytes with oxidized-LDL induced the expression of BNP and CCL2 genes, while native LDL (N-LDL) had no effect.

Treatment with melatonin in old mice with age related liver inflammation decreased the mRNA expression of TNF-α, IL-1β, HO (HO-1 and HO-2), iNOS, CCL2, NF-κB1, NF-κB2 and NKAP in old male mice. The protein expression of TNF-α, IL-1β was also decreased and IL-10 increased with melatonin treatment. Exogenous administration of melatonin was able to reduce inflammation.
