= CXCR5 =

Protein-coding gene in humans

Identifiers
- Aliases: CXCR5, BLR1, CD185, MDR15, C-X-C motif chemokine receptor 5, C-X-C chemokine receptor type 5
- External IDs: OMIM: 601613; MGI: 103567; GeneCards: CXCR5

Gene location (Human)
Chr.	Chromosome 11 (human)
Band	11q23.3	Start	118,883,892 bp
Band	11q23.3	End	118,897,787 bp

Gene location (Mouse)
Chr.	Chromosome 9 (mouse)
Band	9 A5.2|9 24.84 cM	Start	44,423,084 bp
Band	9 A5.2|9 24.84 cM	End	44,473,174 bp
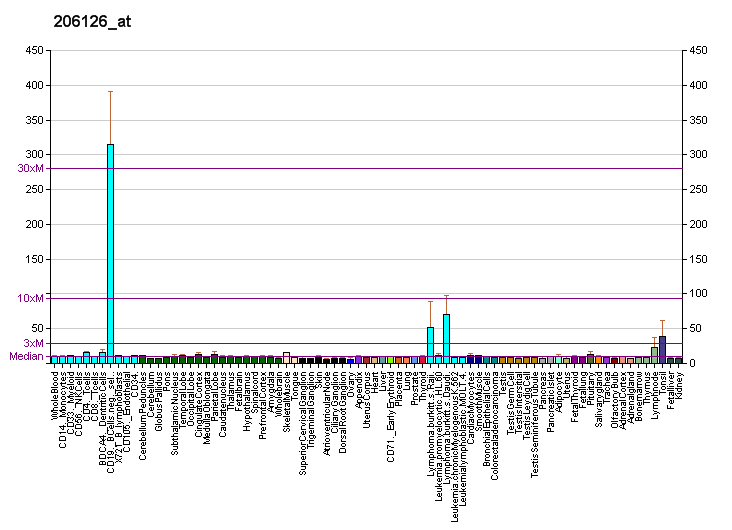

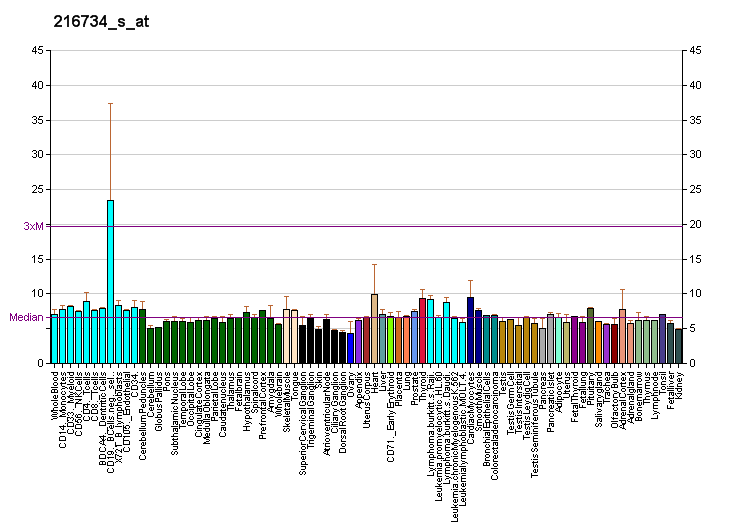
RNA expression pattern
Bgee	Human / Mouse (ortholog); Top expressed in: granulocyte; spleen; lymph node; appendix; testicle; blood; muscle of thigh; apex of heart; ascending aorta; tibial arteries / Top expressed in: mesenteric lymph nodes; spleen; spermatid; blood; subcutaneous adipose tissue; granulocyte; spermatocyte; lumbar spinal ganglion; left lung; tunica adventitia of aorta; More reference expression data
BioGPS	More reference expression data
Gene ontology
Molecular function	C-X-C chemokine receptor activity; G protein-coupled receptor activity; protein binding; signal transducer activity; C-C chemokine receptor activity; chemokine binding; C-C chemokine binding
Cellular component	integral component of membrane; plasma membrane; integral component of plasma membrane; membrane; external side of plasma membrane
Biological process	positive regulation of cytokinesis; chemokine-mediated signaling pathway; chemotaxis; B cell activation; G protein-coupled receptor signaling pathway; lymph node development; immune response; signal transduction; leukocyte chemotaxis; positive regulation of cytosolic calcium ion concentration; calcium-mediated signaling; cell chemotaxis
Sources:Amigo / QuickGO
Orthologs
Databases	NCBI: entry; OMA: entry
Species	Human	Mouse
Entrez	643	12145
Ensembl	ENSG00000160683	ENSMUSG00000047880
UniProt	P32302	Q04683
RefSeq (mRNA)	NM_032966; NM_001716	NM_007551
RefSeq (protein)	NP_001707; NP_116743	NP_031577
Location (UCSC)	Chr 11: 118.88 – 118.9 Mb	Chr 9: 44.42 – 44.47 Mb
PubMed search
- Wikidata
View/Edit Human	View/Edit Mouse

C-X-C chemokine receptor type 5 (CXC-R5) also known as CD185 (cluster of differentiation 185) or Burkitt lymphoma receptor 1 (BLR1) is a G protein-coupled seven transmembrane receptor for chemokine CXCL13 (also known as BLC) and belongs to the CXC chemokine receptor family. It enables T cells to migrate to lymph node and the B cell zones. In humans, the CXC-R5 protein is encoded by the CXCR5 gene.

== Tissue distribution and function ==
The BLR1 / CXCR5 gene is specifically expressed in Burkitt's lymphoma and lymphatic tissues, such as follicles in lymph nodes as well as in spleen. The gene plays an essential role in B cell migration. Through CXCL13 secretions B cells are able to locate the lymph node.

Additionally, some recent studies have suggested that CXCL13, through CXCR5, is capable of recruiting hematopoietic precursor cells (CD3^{−} CD4^{+}) which would cause the development of lymph nodes and Peyer's Patches.

Other studies highlight the role of CXCR5 in T cells, as they are unable to access B cell follicles without CXCR5 expression. This is a key step in the production of high affinity antibodies as B cells and T cells need to interact in order to activate the Ig class switch.

CXCR5 has been shown to be expressed on both CD4 and CD8 T cells, though it is often regarded as the defining marker for T Follicular Helper (Tfh) cells.

== Role in cancer development ==
Recently, it was shown that CXCR5 overexpression in breast cancer patients highly correlates with lymph node metastases, and elevated CXCR5 expression may contribute to abnormal cell survival and migration in breast tumors that lack functional p53 protein. Minor allele of SNP rs630923, located in the area of CXCR5 gene promoter and associated with the risk of multiple sclerosis, is responsible for appearance of MEF2C-binding site resulted in reduced CXCR5 gene promoter activity in B-cells during activation, that could lead to decreased autoimmune response

While chemokines and chemokine receptors have been thought to be involved in cancer development and maintenance, recently CXCR5 has come under investigation for its role in metastatic progression of prostate cancer. A recent study has indicated that prostate cancer tissue as well as cell lines express higher non-basal levels of CXCR5. Furthermore, the study found a correlation between the level of CXCR5 and Gleason score. CXCR5 location was additionally considered and higher Gleason scores correlated with nuclear CXCR5 while cytoplasmic and membrane CXCR5 correlated with benign and early prostate cancers.
