= CXCL16 =

Protein found in humans

Identifiers
- Aliases: CXCL16, CXCLG16, SR-PSOX, SRPSOX, C-X-C motif chemokine ligand 16
- External IDs: OMIM: 605398; MGI: 1932682; GeneCards: CXCL16

Gene location (Human)
Chr.	Chromosome 17 (human)
Band	17p13.2	Start	4,733,533 bp
Band	17p13.2	End	4,739,928 bp

Gene location (Mouse)
Chr.	Chromosome 11 (mouse)
Band	11|11 B3	Start	70,344,809 bp
Band	11|11 B3	End	70,350,810 bp
RNA expression pattern
Bgee	Human / Mouse (ortholog); Top expressed in: left testis; right testis; gallbladder; right lung; upper lobe of left lung; appendix; islet of Langerhans; olfactory zone of nasal mucosa; monocyte; lower lobe of lung / Top expressed in: right kidney; mesenteric lymph nodes; right lung; right lung lobe; duodenum; human kidney; seminal vesicula; stroma of bone marrow; aortic valve; thymus; More reference expression data
BioGPS	n/a
Gene ontology
Molecular function	cytokine activity; chemokine activity; low-density lipoprotein particle receptor activity; scavenger receptor activity
Cellular component	plasma membrane; membrane; extracellular region; integral component of membrane; extracellular space
Biological process	lymphocyte chemotaxis; positive regulation of cell growth; positive regulation of cell migration; receptor-mediated endocytosis; response to tumor necrosis factor; response to cytokine; response to interferon-gamma; chemotaxis; regulation of signaling receptor activity; G protein-coupled receptor signaling pathway; T cell chemotaxis
Sources:Amigo / QuickGO
Orthologs
Databases	NCBI: entry; OMA: entry
Species	Human	Mouse
Entrez	58191	66102
Ensembl	ENSG00000161921	ENSMUSG00000018920
UniProt	Q9H2A7	Q8BSU2
RefSeq (mRNA)	NM_022059; NM_001100812; NM_001386809	NM_023158
RefSeq (protein)	NP_001094282; NP_071342	NP_075647
Location (UCSC)	Chr 17: 4.73 – 4.74 Mb	Chr 11: 70.34 – 70.35 Mb
PubMed search
- Wikidata
View/Edit Human	View/Edit Mouse

Chemokine (C-X-C motif) ligand 16 (CXCL16) is a small cytokine belonging to the CXC chemokine family. Larger than other chemokines (with 254 amino acids), CXCL16 is composed of a CXC chemokine domain, a mucin-like stalk, a transmembrane domain and a cytoplasmic tail containing a potential tyrosine phosphorylation site that may bind SH2.

These are unusual features for a chemokine, allowing CXCL16 to be expressed as a cell surface bound molecule, as well as a soluble chemokine. CXCL16 is produced by dendritic cells found in the T cell zones of lymphoid organs, and by cells found in the red pulp of the spleen. Cells that bind and migrate in response to CXCL16 include several subsets of T cells, and natural killer T (NKT) cells.

CXCL16 interacts with the chemokine receptor CXCR6, also known as Bonzo. Expression of CXCL16 is induced by the inflammatory cytokines IFN-gamma and TNF-alpha. The gene for human CXCL16 is located on chromosome 17.

The administration of folinic acid, which forces the methylation of CXCL 16, induces high levels of methylation of the CXCL 16 gene promoter in colon, ileum and lung and causes iNKT cells accumulation in these tissues. Colonization of neonatal GF mice, but not in adult mice, with a conventional microbiota decreases hypermethylation levels of CXCL 16.
