= CXCL13 =

Mammalian protein found in humans

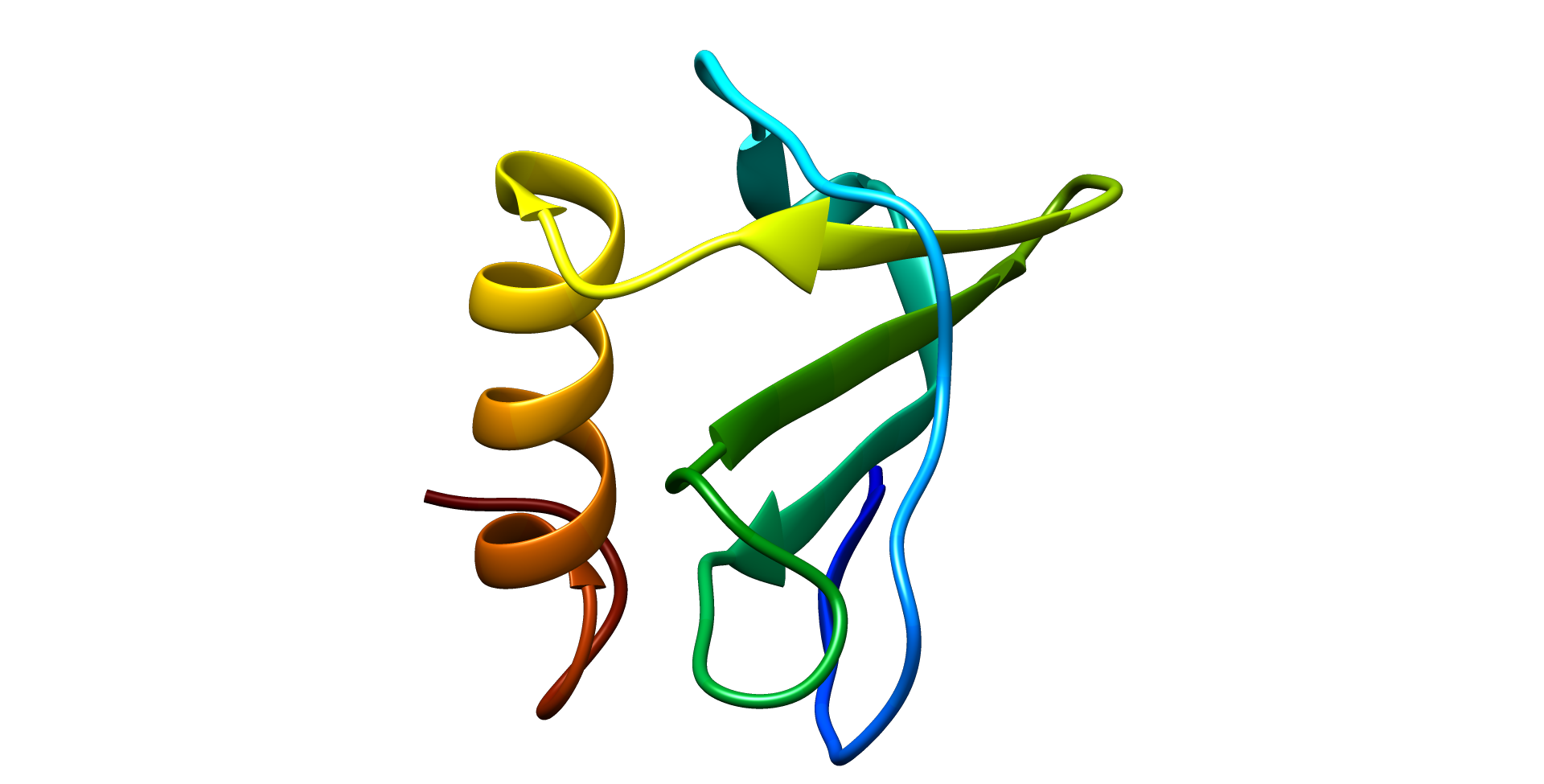

Identifiers
- Aliases: CXCL13, ANGIE, ANGIE2, BCA-1, BCA1, BLC, BLR1L, SCYB13, C-X-C motif chemokine ligand 13
- External IDs: OMIM: 605149; MGI: 1888499; GeneCards: CXCL13
Available structures
PDB	Ortholog search: PDBe RCSB
PDB	List of PDB id codes 4ZAI, 5CBA, 5CBE

Gene location (Human)
Chr.	Chromosome 4 (human)
Band	4q21.1	Start	77,511,753 bp
Band	4q21.1	End	77,611,834 bp

Gene location (Mouse)
Chr.	Chromosome 5 (mouse)
Band	5|5 E3	Start	96,104,810 bp
Band	5|5 E3	End	96,108,927 bp
RNA expression pattern
Bgee	Human / Mouse (ortholog); Top expressed in: spleen; lymph node; appendix; mucosa of ileum; epithelium of nasopharynx; rectum; periodontal fiber; tonsil; superficial temporal artery; decidua / Top expressed in: spleen; mesenteric lymph nodes; migratory enteric neural crest cell; morula; submandibular gland; tunica adventitia of aorta; subcutaneous adipose tissue; Paneth cell; white adipose tissue; external carotid artery; More reference expression data
BioGPS	n/a
Gene ontology
Molecular function	receptor ligand activity; CCR10 chemokine receptor binding; cytokine activity; heparin binding; CXCR3 chemokine receptor binding; chemokine activity; protein heterodimerization activity; fibroblast growth factor binding; CXCR5 chemokine receptor binding
Cellular component	extracellular region; extracellular space
Biological process	chemokine-mediated signaling pathway; positive regulation of cytosolic calcium ion concentration; cell-cell signaling; germinal center formation; regulation of angiogenesis; chemotaxis; endothelial cell chemotaxis to fibroblast growth factor; regulation of humoral immune response; cell surface receptor signaling pathway; response to lipopolysaccharide; regulation of cell population proliferation; defense response to bacterium; negative regulation of endothelial cell chemotaxis to fibroblast growth factor; positive regulation of T cell chemotaxis; immune response; inflammatory response; chronic inflammatory response; defense response; antimicrobial humoral immune response mediated by antimicrobial peptide; regulation of signaling receptor activity; G protein-coupled receptor signaling pathway; lymphocyte chemotaxis across high endothelial venule; positive regulation of integrin activation; positive regulation of cell-cell adhesion mediated by integrin; B cell chemotaxis; activation of GTPase activity; neutrophil chemotaxis; leukocyte chemotaxis; cellular response to lipopolysaccharide
Sources:Amigo / QuickGO
Orthologs
Databases	NCBI: entry; OMA: entry
Species	Human	Mouse
Entrez	10563	55985
Ensembl	ENSG00000156234	ENSMUSG00000023078
UniProt	O43927	O55038
RefSeq (mRNA)	NM_006419; NM_001371558	NM_018866
RefSeq (protein)	NP_006410; NP_001358487	NP_061354
Location (UCSC)	Chr 4: 77.51 – 77.61 Mb	Chr 5: 96.1 – 96.11 Mb
PubMed search
- Wikidata
View/Edit Human	View/Edit Mouse

Chemokine (C-X-C motif) ligand 13 (CXCL13), also known as B lymphocyte chemoattractant (BLC) or B cell-attracting chemokine 1 (BCA-1), is a protein ligand that in humans is encoded by the CXCL13 gene.

== Function ==
CXCL13 is a small chemokine belonging to the CXC chemokine family. As its other names suggest, this chemokine is selectively chemotactic for B cells belonging to both the B-1 and B-2 subsets, and elicits its effects by interacting with chemokine receptor CXCR5. CXCL13 and its receptor CXCR5 control the organization of B cells within follicles of lymphoid tissues and is expressed highly in the liver, spleen, lymph nodes, and gut of humans. The gene for CXCL13 is located on human chromosome 4 in a cluster of other CXC chemokines.

In T lymphocytes, CXCL13 expression is thought to reflect a germinal center origin of the T cell, particularly a subset of T cells called follicular B helper T cells (or T_{FH} cells). Hence, expression of CXCL13 in T-cell lymphomas, such as angioimmunoblastic T-cell lymphoma, is thought to reflect a germinal center origin of the neoplastic T-cells.

== Role in cancer ==
The chemokine CXCL13 plays a dual and context-dependent role in cancer progression and the efficacy of treatments. Within the tumor microenvironment (TME), it is essential for the organization of tertiary lymphoid structures (TLS), which act as hubs for local immune activation and are typically associated with a favorable prognosis and better response to immunotherapy. In contrast, elevated systemic levels of CXCL13 in the plasma have been identified as a significant biomarker of primary resistance to immunotherapy and poor clinical outcomes, especially in non-small cell lung cancer (NSCLC). High circulating levels of CXCL13 often reflect a dysregulated peripheral immune profile characterized by cytotoxic T cell exhaustion (indicated by increased markers such as LAG3 and PD-L1) and impaired B-cell maturation, which together limit the immune system's ability to respond effectively to therapy.
