= CXCL10 =

Mammalian protein found in humans

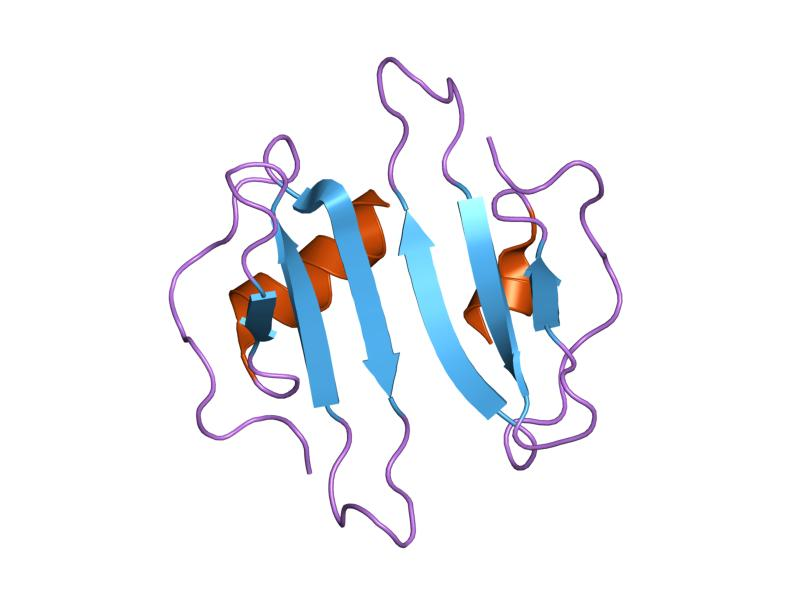

Identifiers
- Aliases: CXCL10, C7, IFI10, INP10, IP-10, SCYB10, crg-2, gIP-10, mob-1, C-X-C motif chemokine ligand 10, C-X-C motif chemokine 10
- External IDs: OMIM: 147310; MGI: 1352450; GeneCards: CXCL10
Available structures
PDB	Ortholog search: PDBe RCSB
PDB	List of PDB id codes 1O80, 1LV9, 1O7Y, 1O7Z

Gene location (Human)
Chr.	Chromosome 4 (human)
Band	4q21.1	Start	76,021,118 bp
Band	4q21.1	End	76,023,497 bp

Gene location (Mouse)
Chr.	Chromosome 5 (mouse)
Band	5 E2|5 46.57 cM	Start	92,494,497 bp
Band	5 E2|5 46.57 cM	End	92,496,748 bp
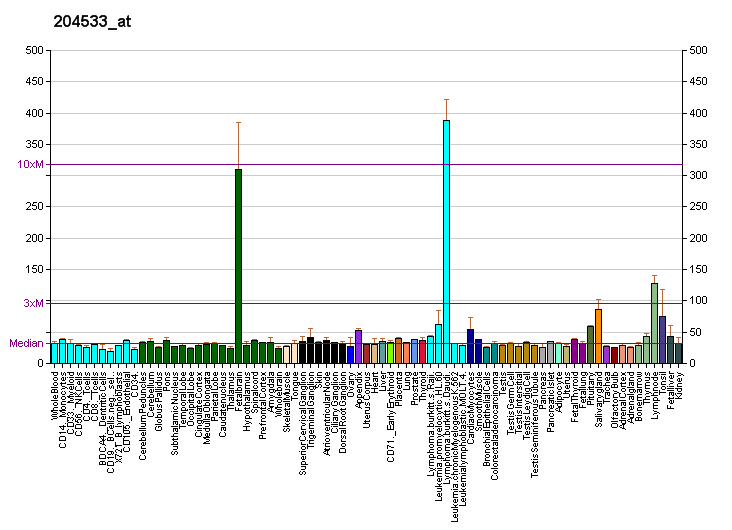
RNA expression pattern
Bgee	Human / Mouse (ortholog); Top expressed in: appendix; testicle; decidua; lymph node; rectum; monocyte; granulocyte; olfactory zone of nasal mucosa; smooth muscle tissue; epithelium of nasopharynx / Top expressed in: mesenteric lymph nodes; thymus; spleen; spermatocyte; optic nerve; embryo; right kidney; subcutaneous adipose tissue; embryo; granulocyte; More reference expression data
BioGPS	More reference expression data
Gene ontology
Molecular function	cytokine activity; heparin binding; CXCR3 chemokine receptor binding; chemokine activity; protein binding; cAMP-dependent protein kinase regulator activity; signaling receptor binding; chemoattractant activity
Cellular component	extracellular region; external side of plasma membrane; extracellular space; intracellular anatomical structure
Biological process	regulation of endothelial tube morphogenesis; negative regulation of myoblast differentiation; cellular response to heat; response to vitamin D; positive regulation of cell migration; T cell chemotaxis; chemokine-mediated signaling pathway; cell-cell signaling; response to virus; muscle organ development; positive regulation of monocyte chemotaxis; positive regulation of release of sequestered calcium ion into cytosol; endothelial cell activation; positive regulation of cAMP-mediated signaling; regulation of T cell chemotaxis; blood circulation; chemotaxis; positive regulation of leukocyte chemotaxis; cell surface receptor signaling pathway; response to lipopolysaccharide; negative regulation of myoblast fusion; defense response to virus; regulation of cell population proliferation; immune response; positive regulation of cell population proliferation; response to auditory stimulus; negative regulation of angiogenesis; response to cold; cellular response to lipopolysaccharide; response to gamma radiation; positive regulation of T cell migration; signal transduction; positive regulation of transcription by RNA polymerase II; regulation of protein kinase activity; defense response; inflammatory response; antimicrobial humoral immune response mediated by antimicrobial peptide; regulation of signaling receptor activity; G protein-coupled receptor signaling pathway; cytokine-mediated signaling pathway; adenylate cyclase-activating G protein-coupled receptor signaling pathway; response to bacterium; neutrophil chemotaxis; leukocyte chemotaxis; positive chemotaxis; regulation of apoptotic process
Sources:Amigo / QuickGO
Orthologs
Databases	NCBI: entry; OMA: entry
Species	Human	Mouse
Entrez	3627	15945
Ensembl	ENSG00000169245	ENSMUSG00000034855
UniProt	P02778	P17515
RefSeq (mRNA)	NM_001565	NM_021274
RefSeq (protein)	NP_001556	NP_067249
Location (UCSC)	Chr 4: 76.02 – 76.02 Mb	Chr 5: 92.49 – 92.5 Mb
PubMed search
- Wikidata
View/Edit Human	View/Edit Mouse

C-X-C motif chemokine ligand 10 (CXCL10), also known as Interferon gamma-induced protein 10 (IP-10) or small-inducible cytokine B10, is an 8.7 kDa protein that in humans is encoded by the CXCL10 gene. C-X-C motif chemokine 10 is a small cytokine belonging to the CXC chemokine family.

== Gene ==
The gene for CXCL10 is located on human chromosome 4 in a cluster among several other CXC chemokines.

== Function ==
CXCL10 is secreted by several cell types in response to IFN-γ. These cell types include monocytes, endothelial cells and fibroblasts. CXCL10 has been attributed to several roles, such as chemoattraction for monocytes/macrophages, T cells, NK cells, and dendritic cells, promotion of T cell adhesion to endothelial cells, antitumor activity, and inhibition of bone marrow colony formation and angiogenesis.

This chemokine elicits its effects by binding to the cell surface chemokine receptor CXCR3.

== Structure ==
The three-dimensional crystal structure of this chemokine has been determined under three different conditions to a resolution of up to 1.92 Å. The Protein Data Bank accession codes for the structures of CXCL10 are 1lv9, 1o7y, and 1o80.

== Biomarkers ==
CXCL9, CXCL10 and CXCL11 have proven to be valid biomarkers for the development of heart failure and left ventricular dysfunction, suggesting an underlining pathophysiological relation between levels of these chemokines and the development of adverse cardiac remodeling.

== Clinical significance ==
Baseline pre-treatment plasma levels of CXCL10 are elevated in patients chronically infected with hepatitis C virus (HCV) of genotypes 1 or 4 who do not achieve a sustained viral response (SVR) after completion of antiviral therapy. CXCL10 in plasma is mirrored by intrahepatic CXCL10 mRNA, and both strikingly predict the first days of elimination of HCV RNA ("first phase decline") during interferon/ribavirin therapy for all HCV genotypes. This also applies for patients co-infected with HIV, where pre-treatment IP-10 levels below 150 pg/mL are predictive of a favorable response, and may thus be useful in encouraging these otherwise difficult-to-treat patients to initiate therapy. The pathogen Leishmania major utilizes a protease, GP63, that cleaves CXCL10, implicating CXCL10 in host defense mechanisms of certain intracellular pathogens like Leishmania. Through binding to the CXCR3 receptor on CD8⁺ T lymphocytes, CXCL10 has been seen to drive their chemotaxis and infiltration through the blood–brain barrier where they have been implicated in neuroinflammation and the development of Alzheimer's disease–related neurodegenerative features.
