= CXCL14 =

Protein found in humans

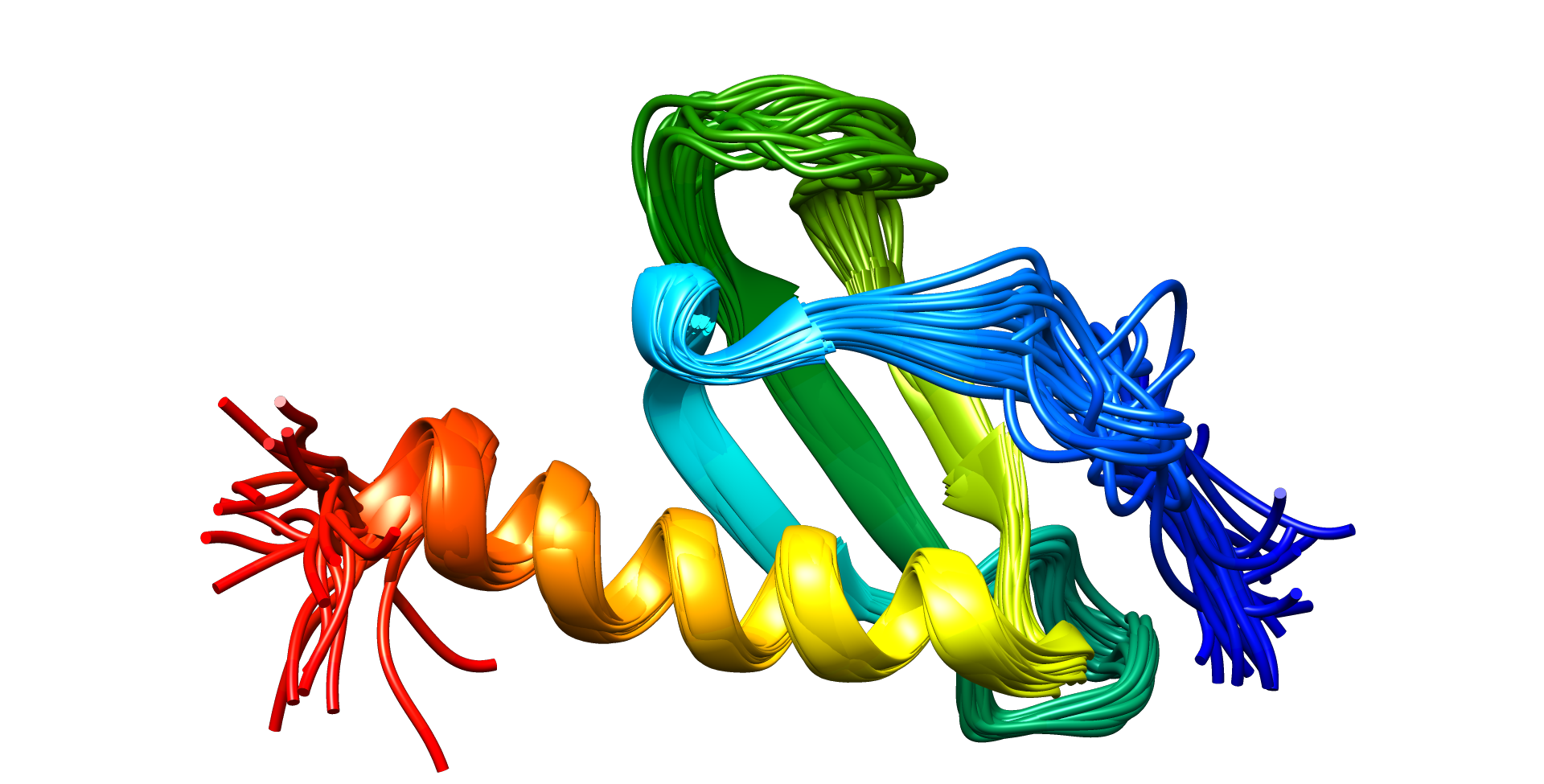

Identifiers
- Aliases: CXCL14, BMAC, BRAK, KEC, KS1, MIP-2g, MIP2G, NJAC, SCYB14, C-X-C motif chemokine ligand 14
- External IDs: OMIM: 604186; MGI: 1888514; GeneCards: CXCL14
Available structures
PDB	Ortholog search: PDBe RCSB
PDB	List of PDB id codes 2HDL

Gene location (Human)
Chr.	Chromosome 5 (human)
Band	5q31.1	Start	135,570,679 bp
Band	5q31.1	End	135,579,279 bp

Gene location (Mouse)
Chr.	Chromosome 13 (mouse)
Band	13|13 B1	Start	56,436,456 bp
Band	13|13 B1	End	56,444,364 bp
RNA expression pattern
Bgee	Human / Mouse (ortholog); Top expressed in: skin of hip; skin of arm; nipple; skin of thigh; kidney tubule; periodontal fiber; pylorus; vulva; skin of abdomen; pericardium / Top expressed in: gastrula; lip; lateral septal nucleus; decidua; hand; olfactory tubercle; inferior colliculi; superior frontal gyrus; epidermis; skin of back; More reference expression data
BioGPS	n/a
Gene ontology
Molecular function	chemokine activity; cytokine activity; protein binding
Cellular component	extracellular region; Golgi apparatus; extracellular space
Biological process	positive regulation of natural killer cell chemotaxis; inner ear development; chemotaxis; cell-cell signaling; negative regulation of myoblast differentiation; immune response; signal transduction; cell chemotaxis; antimicrobial humoral immune response mediated by antimicrobial peptide; regulation of signaling receptor activity
Sources:Amigo / QuickGO
Orthologs
Databases	NCBI: entry; OMA: entry
Species	Human	Mouse
Entrez	9547	57266
Ensembl	ENSG00000145824	ENSMUSG00000021508
UniProt	O95715	Q9WUQ5
RefSeq (mRNA)	NM_004887	NM_019568
RefSeq (protein)	NP_004878	NP_062514
Location (UCSC)	Chr 5: 135.57 – 135.58 Mb	Chr 13: 56.44 – 56.44 Mb
PubMed search
- Wikidata
View/Edit Human	View/Edit Mouse

Chemokine (C-X-C motif) ligand 14 (CXCL14) is a small cytokine belonging to the CXC chemokine family that is also known as BRAK (for breast and kidney-expressed chemokine). Mature CXCL14 has many of the conserved features of the CXC chemokine subfamily but has some differences too, such as a shorter N-terminus and five extra amino acids in the region between its third and fourth cysteines. CXCL14 is constitutively expressed at high levels in many normal tissues, where its cellular source is thought to be fibroblasts. However, it is reduced or absent from most cancer cells. This chemokine is chemotactic for monocytes and can activate these cells in the presence of an inflammatory mediator called prostaglandin-E2 (PGE2). It is also a potent chemoattractant and activator of dendritic cells, is implicated in homing of these cells, and can stimulate the migration of activated NK cells. CXCL14 also inhibits angiogenesis, possibly as a result of its ability to block endothelial cell chemotaxis. The gene for CXCL14 contains four exons and is located on chromosome 5 in humans.
