= Cluster of differentiation =

Classification in immunology

The cluster of differentiation (also known as cluster of designation or classification determinant and often abbreviated as CD) is a protocol used for the identification and investigation of cell surface molecules providing targets for immunophenotyping of cells. In terms of physiology, CD molecules can act in numerous ways, often acting as receptors or ligands important to the cell. A signal cascade is usually initiated, altering the behavior of the cell (see cell signaling). Some CD proteins do not play a role in cell signaling, but have other functions, such as cell adhesion. Although there are more than 400 molecules used for inmunophenotyping, according to the Human Leukocyte Differentiation Antigens (HLDA), in humans there are 371 different CDs (as of October, 2026). This is because there are many subtypes of each CD, like CD1a, CD1b, and so forth.

== Nomenclature ==
The CD nomenclature was proposed and established in the 1st International Workshop and Conference on Human Leukocyte Differentiation Antigens (HLDA), held in Paris in 1982. This system was intended for the classification of the many monoclonal antibodies (mAbs) generated by different laboratories around the world against epitopes on the surface molecules of leukocytes (white blood cells). Since then, its use has expanded to many other cell types, and more than 370 CD unique clusters and subclusters have been identified. The proposed surface molecule is assigned a CD number once two specific monoclonal antibodies are shown to bind to the molecule. If the molecule has not been well characterized or has only one mAb, it is usually given the provisional indicator "w" (as in "CDw186").

For instance, CD2 mAbs are reagents that react with a 50‐kDa transmembrane glycoprotein expressed on T cells. The CD designations were used to describe the recognized molecules but had to be clarified by attaching the term antigen or molecule to the designation (e.g., CD2 molecule). Currently, "CD2" is generally used to designate the molecule, and "CD2 antibody" is used to designate the antibody.

Cell populations are usually defined using a '+' or a '−' symbol to indicate whether a certain cell fraction expresses or lacks a CD molecule. For example, a "CD34+, CD31−" cell is one that expresses CD34 but not CD31. This CD combination typically corresponds to a stem cell, as opposed to a fully differentiated endothelial cell. Some cell populations can also be defined as ^{hi}, ^{mid}, or ^{low} (alternatively, ^{bright}, ^{mid}, or ^{dim}), indicating an overall variability in CD expression, particularly when compared to other cells being studied. A review of the development of T cells in the thymus uses this nomenclature to identify cells transitioning from CD4^{mid}/CD8^{mid} double-positive cells to CD4^{hi}/CD8^{mid}.

== Human Leukocyte Differentiation Antigen Workshops ==
Since 1982 there have been nine Human Leukocyte Differentiation Antigen Workshops culminating in a conference.

Workshop	City	Year	CDs assigned	Reference
I	Paris	1982	1-15	
II	Boston	1984	16-26	
III	Oxford	1986	27-45	
IV	Vienna	1989	46-78	
V	Boston	1993	79-130	
VI	Kobe	1996	131-166	
VII	Harrogate	2000	167-247	
VIII	Adelaide	2004	248-339	
IX	Barcelona	2010	340-364	
X	Wollongong	2014	365-371	

== Immunophenotyping ==
Cluster of Differentiation

The CD system is commonly used as cell markers in immunophenotyping, allowing cells to be defined based on what molecules are present on their surface. These markers are often used to associate cells with certain immune functions. While using one CD molecule to define populations is uncommon (though a few examples exist), combining markers has allowed for cell types with very specific definitions within the immune system.

CD molecules are utilized in cell sorting using various methods, including flow cytometry.

Type of cell	CD markers
stem cells	CD34+, CD31-, CD117
all leukocyte groups	CD45+
Granulocyte	CD45+, CD11b, CD15+, CD24+, CD114+, CD182+
Monocyte	CD4, CD45+, CD14+, CD114+, CD11a, CD11b, CD91+, CD16+
T lymphocyte	CD45+, CD3+
T helper cell	CD45+, CD3+, CD4+
T regulatory cell	CD4, CD25, FOXP3 (a transcription factor)
Cytotoxic T cell	CD45+, CD3+, CD8+
B lymphocyte	CD45+, CD19+, CD20+, CD24+, CD38, CD22
Thrombocyte	CD45+, CD61+
Natural killer cell	CD16+, CD56+, CD3-, CD31, CD30, CD38

Two commonly used CD molecules are CD4 and CD8, which are, in general, used as markers for helper and cytotoxic T cells, respectively. These molecules are defined in combination with CD3+, as some other leukocytes also express these CD molecules (some macrophages express low levels of CD4; dendritic cells express high levels of CD8). Human immunodeficiency virus binds CD4 and a chemokine receptor on the surface of a T helper cell to gain entry. The number of CD4 and CD8 T cells in blood is often used to monitor the progression of HIV infection.

== Physiological functions ==
While CD molecules are very useful in defining leukocytes, they are not merely markers on the cell surface. Though only a fraction of known CD molecules have been thoroughly characterised, most of them have important functions. In the example of CD4 and CD8, these molecules are critical in antigen recognition. Others (e.g., CD135) act as cell surface receptors for growth factors. Recently, the marker CD47 was found to have anti-phagocytic signals to macrophages and inhibit natural killer (NK) cells. This enabled researchers to apply CD47 as a potential target to attenuate immune rejection.

== See also ==
- Antibodies
- CD71/Transferrin receptor-1
- CD13 marker for kidney disorder
- CD33 marker for AML treatment
- CD4+/CD8+ ratio
- Immune system
- Immune tolerance
- Leukocytes
- Major histocompatibility complex
- Signal transduction
