= CXCR6 =

Protein-coding gene in humans

Identifiers
- Aliases: CXCR6, BONZO, CD186, STRL33, TYMSTR, C-X-C motif chemokine receptor 6
- External IDs: OMIM: 605163; MGI: 1934582; GeneCards: CXCR6

Gene location (Human)
Chr.	Chromosome 3 (human)
Band	3p21.31	Start	45,940,933 bp
Band	3p21.31	End	45,948,351 bp

Gene location (Mouse)
Chr.	Chromosome 9 (mouse)
Band	9 F4|9 74.57 cM	Start	123,635,540 bp
Band	9 F4|9 74.57 cM	End	123,640,825 bp
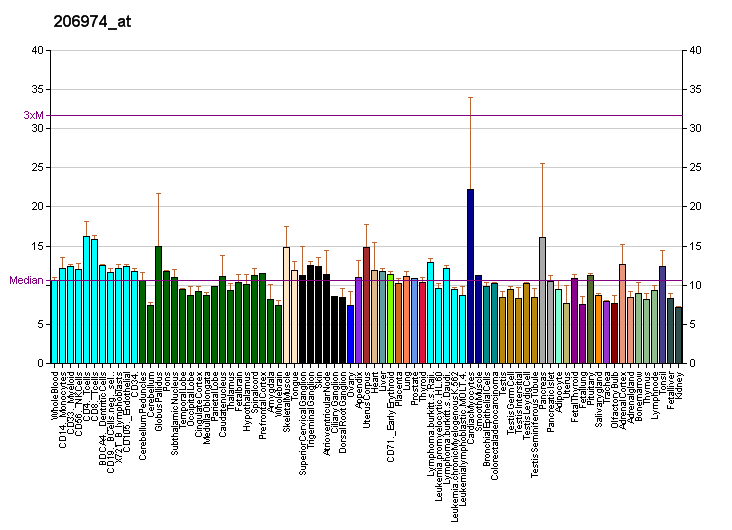

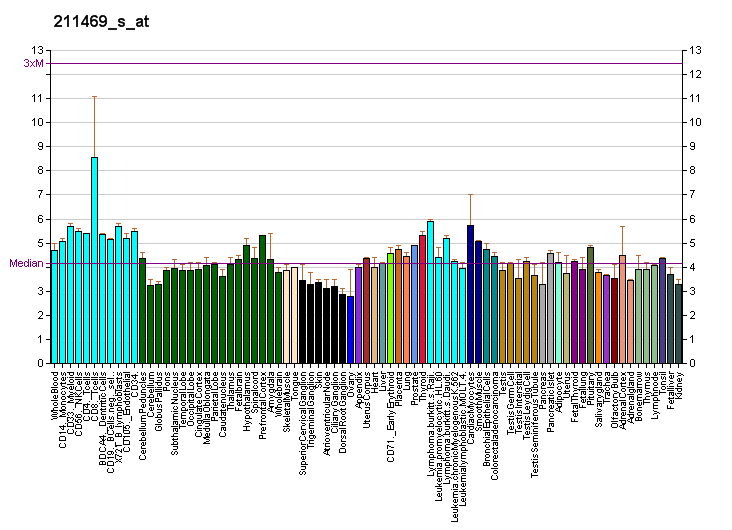
RNA expression pattern
Bgee	Human / Mouse (ortholog); Top expressed in: spleen; lymph node; amniotic fluid; gallbladder; appendix; blood; tonsil; mucosa of transverse colon; granulocyte; epithelium of colon / Top expressed in: thymus; embryo; embryo; mesenteric lymph nodes; spleen; blastocyst; blood; subcutaneous adipose tissue; right kidney; duodenum; More reference expression data
BioGPS	More reference expression data
Gene ontology
Molecular function	C-X-C chemokine receptor activity; C-X-C chemokine binding; G protein-coupled receptor activity; chemokine receptor activity; signal transducer activity; coreceptor activity; C-C chemokine receptor activity; chemokine binding; C-C chemokine binding
Cellular component	integral component of membrane; plasma membrane; integral component of plasma membrane; membrane; intracellular anatomical structure; external side of plasma membrane
Biological process	viral genome replication; chemotaxis; chemokine-mediated signaling pathway; G protein-coupled receptor signaling pathway; inflammatory response; signal transduction; immune response; positive regulation of cytosolic calcium ion concentration; calcium-mediated signaling; cell chemotaxis
Sources:Amigo / QuickGO
Orthologs
Databases	NCBI: entry; OMA: entry
Species	Human	Mouse
Entrez	10663	80901
Ensembl	ENSG00000172215	ENSMUSG00000048521
UniProt	O00574	Q9EQ16
RefSeq (mRNA)	NM_006564	NM_030712
RefSeq (protein)	NP_006555	NP_109637
Location (UCSC)	Chr 3: 45.94 – 45.95 Mb	Chr 9: 123.64 – 123.64 Mb
PubMed search
- Wikidata
View/Edit Human	View/Edit Mouse

C-X-C chemokine receptor type 6 is a protein that in humans is encoded by the CXCR6 gene. CXCR6 has also recently been designated CD186 (cluster of differentiation 186).

CXCR6 has been identified as an entry coreceptor used by HIV-1 and SIV to enter target cells, in conjunction with CD4. It is a minor coreceptor for HIV-1, nearly all strains of which use CCR5 and/or CXCR4. Most SIV strains can use CXCR6 and recent evidence suggests that in monkeys that serve as the natural hosts of SIV, CXCR6 may be a major coreceptor. CXCR6 was previously known as "Bonzo" and "STRL33" in the HIV/SIV field.
