= Chemokine receptor =

Cytokine receptor

Chemokine receptor family
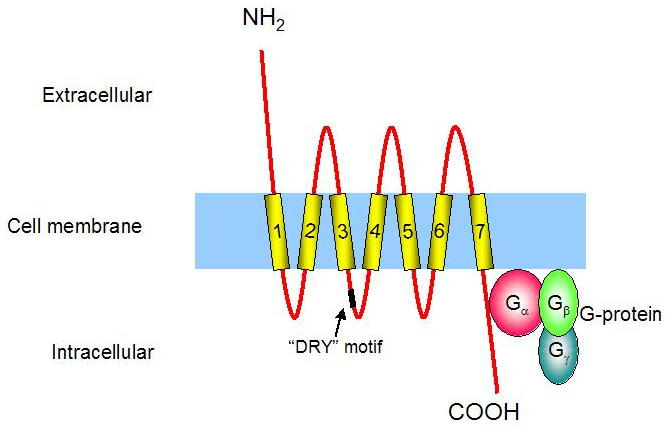
- Typical structure of a chemokine receptor, with seven transmembrane helices and a characteristic "DRY" motif

Identifiers
- Symbol: Chemokine_rcpt
- InterPro: IPR000355
Available protein structures:
- PDB: IPR000355
- AlphaFold: IPR000355

Chemokine receptors are cytokine receptors found on the surface of certain cells that interact with a type of cytokine called a chemokine. There have been 20 distinct chemokine receptors discovered in humans. Each has a rhodopsin-like 7-transmembrane (7TM) structure and couples to G-protein for signal transduction within a cell, making them members of a large protein family of G protein-coupled receptors (GPCRs). Following interaction with their specific chemokine ligands, chemokine receptors trigger a flux in intracellular calcium (Ca^{2+}) ions (calcium signaling). This causes cell responses, including the onset of a process known as chemotaxis that traffics the cell to a desired location within the organism. Chemokine receptors are divided into different families, CXC chemokine receptors, CC chemokine receptors, CX3C chemokine receptors and XC chemokine receptors that correspond to the 4 distinct subfamilies of chemokines they bind. The four subfamilies of chemokines differ in the spacing of structurally important cysteine residues near the N-terminal of the chemokine.

== Structure ==
Chemokine receptors are G protein-coupled receptors containing 7 transmembrane helices that are found predominantly on the surface of leukocytes. Approximately 19 different chemokine receptors have been characterized to date, which share many common structural features. They are composed of about 350 amino acids that are divided into a short and acidic N-terminal end, seven transmembrane helices with three intracellular and three extracellular hydrophilic loops, and an intracellular C-terminus containing serine and threonine residues that act as phosphorylation sites during receptor regulation. The first two extracellular loops of chemokine receptors are linked together by disulfide bonding between two conserved cysteine residues. The N-terminal end of a chemokine receptor binds to chemokines and is important for ligand specificity. G-proteins couple to the C-terminal end, which is important for receptor signaling following ligand binding. Although chemokine receptors share high amino acid identity in their primary sequences, they typically bind a limited number of ligands. Chemokine receptors are redundant in their function as more than one chemokine is able to bind to a single receptor.

== Signal transduction ==
Intracellular signaling by chemokine receptors is dependent on neighbouring G-proteins. G-proteins exist as a heterotrimer; they are composed of three distinct subunits. When the molecule GDP is bound to the G-protein subunit, the G-protein is in an inactive state. Following binding of the chemokine ligand, chemokine receptors associate with G-proteins, allowing the exchange of GDP for another molecule called GTP, and the dissociation of the different G protein subunits. The subunit called Gα activates an enzyme known as Phospholipase C (PLC) that is associated with the cell membrane. PLC cleaves Phosphatidylinositol (4,5)-bisphosphate to form two second messenger molecules called inositol triphosphate (IP_{3}) and diacylglycerol (DAG); DAG activates another enzyme called protein kinase C (PKC), and IP_{3} triggers the release of calcium from intracellular stores. These events promote many signaling cascades, effecting a cellular response.

For example, when CXCL8 (IL-8) binds to its specific receptors, CXCR1 or CXCR2, a rise in intracellular calcium activates the enzyme phospholipase D (PLD) that goes on to initiate an intracellular signaling cascade called the MAP kinase pathway. At the same time, the G-protein subunit Gα directly activates an enzyme called protein tyrosine kinase (PTK), which phosphorylates serine and threonine residues in the tail of the chemokine receptor, causing its desensitisation or inactivation. The initiated MAP kinase pathway activates specific cellular mechanisms involved in chemotaxis, degranulation, release of superoxide anions, and changes in the avidity of cell adhesion molecules called integrins. Chemokines and their receptors play a crucial role in cancer metastasis as they are involved in extravasation, migration, micrometastasis, and angiogenesis. This role of chemokine is strikingly similar to their normal function of localizing leukocytes to an inflammatory site.

== Families ==
- CXC chemokine receptors (six members)
- CC chemokine receptors (ten/eleven members)
- C chemokine receptors (one member, XCR1)
- CX_{3}C chemokine receptors (one member, CX3CR1)

Fifty chemokines have been discovered so far, and most bind onto CXC and CC families. Two types of chemokines that bind to these receptors are inflammatory chemokines and homeostatic chemokines. Inflammatory chemokines are expressed upon leukocyte activation, whereas homeostatic chemokines show continual expression.
