= BTG =

BTG may refer to:

== Businesses and organisations ==
- BTG (company), a British maker of healthcare technology
- Battalion tactical group, a class of Russian military formation
- BT Group, a British telecommunications multinational

== Places in England ==
- Barnt Green railway station, West Midlands
- Bishop Thomas Grant School, London

== Other uses ==
- Bitcoin Gold, a cryptocurrency
- Bradley Trevor Greive, Australian author

== See also ==
- BTG1, a protein-coding gene
- BTG2, another
- BTG3, another
