= Protein BTG2 =

Protein found in humans

BTG2
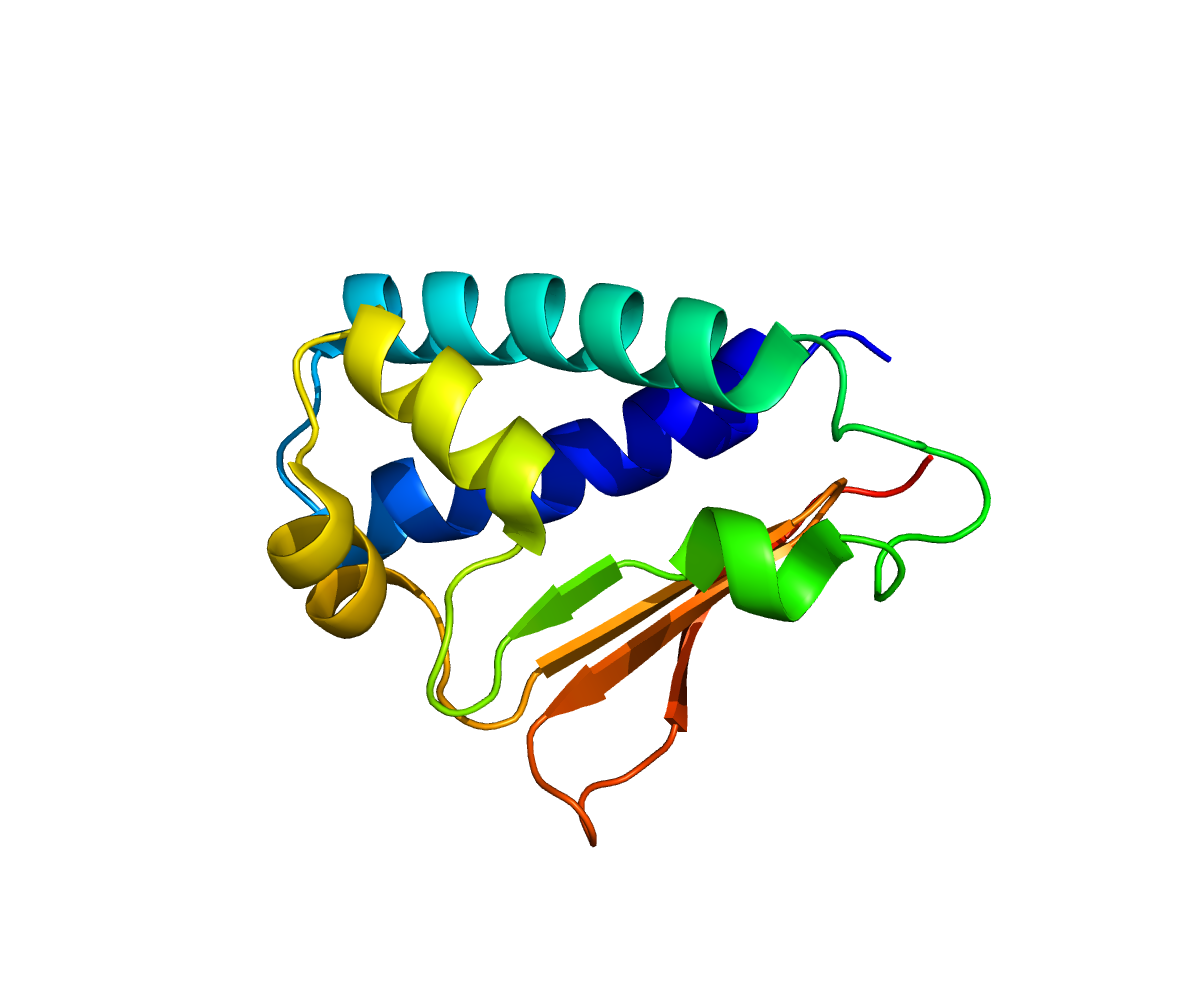

Identifiers
- Aliases: BTG2, PC3, TIS21, BTG family member 2, BTG anti-proliferation factor 2, APRO1
- External IDs: OMIM: 601597; MGI: 108384; GeneCards: BTG2
Available structures
| PDB | Ortholog search: PDBe RCSB |
| PDB | List of PDB id codes 3DJU, 3E9V |

Gene location (Human)
| Chr. | Chromosome 1 (human) |
| Band | 1q32.1 | Start | 203,305,491 bp |
| Band | 1q32.1 | End | 203,309,602 bp |

Gene location (Mouse)
| Chr. | Chromosome 1 (mouse) |
| Band | 1 E4|1 58.1 cM | Start | 134,002,908 bp |
| Band | 1 E4|1 58.1 cM | End | 134,006,858 bp |
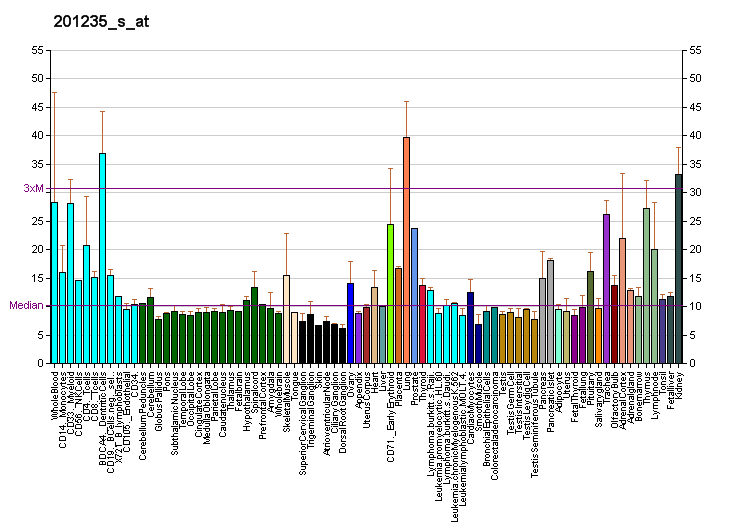

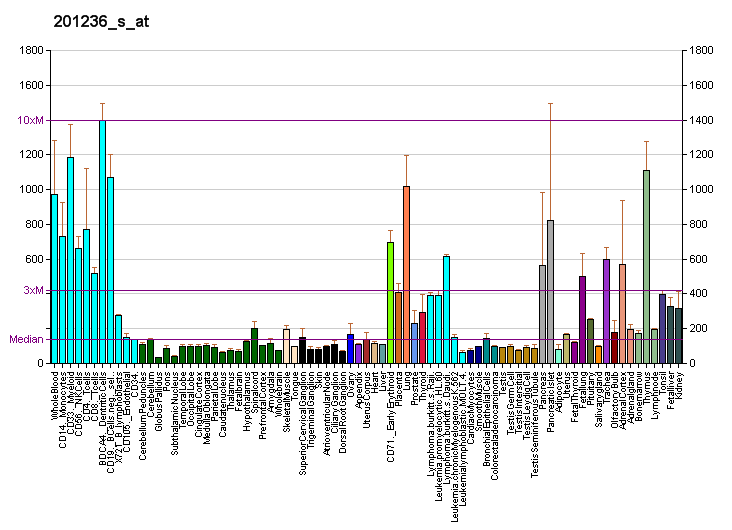
RNA expression pattern
| Bgee | Human / Mouse (ortholog); Top expressed in: gastric mucosa; cardia; body of pancreas; trachea; renal medulla; gallbladder; muscle of thigh; mucosa of paranasal sinus; left uterine tube; periodontal fiber / Top expressed in: granulocyte; thymus; islet of Langerhans; right lung; right lung lobe; left lung; ventricular zone; left lung lobe; pyloric antrum; spleen; More reference expression data |
| BioGPS | More reference expression data |
Gene ontology
| Molecular function | DNA-binding transcription repressor activity, RNA polymerase II-specific; protein binding |
| Cellular component | extracellular exosome; cytosol; nucleus; cytoplasm |
| Biological process | negative regulation of neuron apoptotic process; negative regulation of translation; positive regulation of nuclear-transcribed mRNA poly(A) tail shortening; associative learning; regulation of transcription, DNA-templated; response to organic cyclic compound; dentate gyrus development; negative regulation of neural precursor cell proliferation; response to mechanical stimulus; response to peptide hormone; negative regulation of apoptotic process; negative regulation of transcription by RNA polymerase II; response to electrical stimulus; response to organic substance; transcription, DNA-templated; cellular response to DNA damage stimulus; central nervous system neuron development; response to organonitrogen compound; neuron differentiation; skeletal muscle cell differentiation; neuron projection development; DNA repair; anterior/posterior pattern specification; protein methylation; negative regulation of cell population proliferation; DNA damage response, signal transduction by p53 class mediator resulting in cell cycle arrest; negative regulation of mitotic cell cycle |
Sources:Amigo / QuickGO
Orthologs
| Databases | NCBI: entry; OMA: entry |
| Species | Human | Mouse |
| Entrez | 7832 | 12227 |
| Ensembl | ENSG00000159388 | ENSMUSG00000020423 |
| UniProt | P78543 | Q04211 |
| RefSeq (mRNA) | NM_006763 | NM_007570 |
| RefSeq (protein) | NP_006754 | NP_031596 |
| Location (UCSC) | Chr 1: 203.31 – 203.31 Mb | Chr 1: 134 – 134.01 Mb |
| PubMed search |
- Wikidata
| View/Edit Human | View/Edit Mouse |

Protein BTG2, also known as BTG family member 2 or NGF-inducible anti-proliferative protein PC3 or NGF-inducible protein TIS21, is a protein that in humans is encoded by the BTG2 gene (B-cell translocation gene 2) and in other mammals by the homologous Btg2 gene. This protein controls cell cycle progression and proneural genes expression by acting as a transcription coregulator that enhances or inhibits the activity of transcription factors.

The protein BTG2 is the human homolog of the PC3 (pheochromocytoma cell 3) protein in rat and of the Tis21 (tetradecanoyl phorbol acetate-inducible sequence 21) protein in mouse. Tis21 had been originally isolated as a sequence induced by TPA in mouse fibroblasts, whereas PC3 was originally isolated as sequence induced at the beginning of neuron differentiation; BTG2 was then isolated in human cells as sequence induced by p53 and DNA damage.

The protein encoded by the gene BTG2 (which is the official name assigned to the gene PC3/Tis21/BTG2) is a member of the BTG/Tob family (that comprises six proteins BTG1, BTG2/PC3/Tis21, BTG3/ANA, BTG4/PC3B, Tob1/Tob and Tob2). This family has structurally related proteins that appear to have antiproliferative properties. In particular, the BTG2 protein has been shown to negatively control a cell cycle checkpoint at the G_{1} to S phase transition in fibroblasts and neuronal cells by direct inhibition of the activity of cyclin D1 promoter.

== Regulator of neuron differentiation ==
A number of studies in vivo have shown that BTG2 expression is associated with the neurogenic asymmetric division in neural progenitor cells. Tis21-GFP has been used as a neurogenic marker because it is not expressed until neurogenesis begins, is present in almost all early-born neurons, and interacts with neuron producing intermediate progenitor cells. Moreover, when directly overexpressed in vivo in neural progenitor cells, BTG2 induces their differentiation. In fact, in the neuronal PC12 cell line BTG2 is not able to trigger differentiation by itself, but only to synergize with NGF, while in vivo BTG2 is fully able to induce differentiation of progenitor cells, i.e., during embryonic development in the neuroblast of the neural tube and in granule precursors of cerebellum, as well in adult progenitor cells of the dentate gyrus and of the subventricular zone. Notably, it has recently been shown that BTG2 is essential for the differentiation of new neurons, using a BTG2 knock out mouse. BTG2 is thus a pan-neural gene required for the development of the new neurons generated during adulthood, in the two neurogenic regions of adult brain, i.e., the hippocampus and the subventricular zone. Such requirement of BTG2 in neuron maturation is consistent with the fact that during brain development BTG2 is expressed in the proliferating neuroblasts of the ventricular zone of the neural tube, and to a lower extent in the differentiating neuroblasts of the mantle zone; postnatally it is expressed in cerebellar precursors mainly in the proliferating regions of the neuropithelium (i.e., in the external granular layer), and in the hippocampus in proliferating and differentiating progenitor cells. The pro-differentiative action of BTG2 appears to be consequent not only to inhibition of cell cycle progression but also to a BTG2-dependent activation of proneural genes in neural progenitor cells. In fact, BTG2 activates proneural genes by associating with the promoter of Id3, a key inhibitor of proneural gene activity, and by negatively regulating its activity.

BTG2 is a transcriptional cofactor, given that it has been shown to associate with, and regulate the promoters not only of Id3 but also of cyclin D1 and RAR-β, being part of transcriptional complexes. It has been shown that when the differentiation of new neurons of the hippocampus - a brain region important for learning and memory - is either accelerated or delayed by means of overexpression or deletion of BTG2, respectively, spatial and contextual memory is heavily altered. This suggests that the time the young neurons spend in different states of neuronal differentiation is critical for their ultimate function in learning and memory, and that BTG2 may play a role in the timing of recruitment of the new neuron into memory circuits.

In conclusion, the main action of Btg2 on neural progenitor cells of the dentate gyrus and subventricular zone during adult neurogenesis is the positive control of their terminal differentiation (see for review:). During the early postnatal development of the cerebellum, Btg2 is mainly required to control the migration and differentiation of the precursor cells of cerebellar granule neurons. In contrast, BTG1, the closest homolog to Btg2, appears to negatively regulate the proliferation of adult stem cells in the dentate gyrus and subventricular zone, maintaining in quiescence the stem cells pool and preserving it from depletion. BTG1 is also necessary to limit the proliferative expansion of cerebellar precursor cells, as without BTG1 the adult cerebellum is larger and unable to coordinate motor activity.

== Medulloblastoma suppressor ==
BTG2 has been shown to inhibit medulloblastoma, the very aggressive tumor of cerebellum, by inhibiting the proliferation and triggering the differentiation of the precursors of cerebellar granule neurons. This demonstration was obtained by overexpressing BTG2 in a mouse model of medulloblastoma, presenting activation of the sonic hedgehog pathway (heterozygous for the gene Patched1). More recently, it has been shown that the ablation of BTG2 greatly enhances the medulloblastoma frequency by inhibiting the migration of cerebellar granule neuron precursors. This impairment of migration of the precursors of cerebellar granule neurons forces them to remain at the surface of the cerebellum, where they continue to proliferate, becoming target of transforming insults. The impairment of migration of the precursors of cerebellar granule neurons (GCPs) depends on the inhibition of expression of the chemokine CXCL3 consequent to ablation of BTG2. In fact, the transcription of CXCL3 is directly regulated by BTG2, and CXCL3 is able to induce cell-autonomously the migration of cerebellar granule precursors. Treatment with CXCL3 prevents the growth of medulloblastoma lesions in a Shh-type mouse model of medulloblastoma. Thus, CXCL3 is a target for medulloblastoma therapy.

== Interactions ==
BTG2 has been shown to interact with PRMT1, HOXB9, CNOT8 and HDAC1 HDAC4 and HDAC9. It has also been studied with Pax6 and Tbr2 when observing the role of Tis21 in neurogenic divisions.
