= MINDY2 =

Identifiers
- Aliases: MINDY2, FAM63B, MINDY lysine 48 deubiquitinase 2
- External IDs: OMIM: 618408; MGI: 2443086; GeneCards: MINDY2
Enzyme activity
EC #	BRENDA	ExPASy	KEGG	MetaCyc
3.4.19.12	↗	↗	↗	↗

Gene location (Human)
Chr.	Chromosome 15 (human)
Band	15q21.3-q22.1	Start	58,771,192 bp
Band	15q21.3-q22.1	End	58,861,900 bp

Gene location (Mouse)
Chr.	Chromosome 9 (mouse)
Band	9|9 D	Start	70,506,296 bp
Band	9|9 D	End	70,564,456 bp
RNA expression pattern
Bgee	Human / Mouse (ortholog); Top expressed in: trigeminal ganglion; saphenous vein; pons; superior vestibular nucleus; pericardium; spinal ganglia; inferior ganglion of vagus nerve; subthalamic nucleus; renal medulla; superior surface of tongue / Top expressed in: cerebellar vermis; lobe of cerebellum; otolith organ; utricle; lateral geniculate nucleus; mammillary body; transitional epithelium of urinary bladder; lateral septal nucleus; ventromedial nucleus; olfactory system; More reference expression data
BioGPS	n/a
Gene ontology
Molecular function	thiol-dependent deubiquitinase; cysteine-type carboxypeptidase activity; peptidase activity; cysteine-type peptidase activity; hydrolase activity; Lys48-specific deubiquitinase activity; K48-linked polyubiquitin modification-dependent protein binding; K63-linked polyubiquitin modification-dependent protein binding; K11-linked polyubiquitin modification-dependent protein binding; K6-linked polyubiquitin modification-dependent protein binding
Cellular component	nucleoplasm; cytosol
Biological process	protein K48-linked deubiquitination; proteolysis; biological process
Sources:Amigo / QuickGO
Orthologs
Databases	NCBI: entry; OMA: entry
Species	Human	Mouse
Entrez	54629	235461
Ensembl	ENSG00000128923	ENSMUSG00000042444
UniProt	Q8NBR6	Q6PDI6
RefSeq (mRNA)	NM_001040450; NM_001040453; NM_019092	NM_172772; NM_001374686
RefSeq (protein)	NP_001035540; NP_001035543	NP_766360; NP_001361615
Location (UCSC)	Chr 15: 58.77 – 58.86 Mb	Chr 9: 70.51 – 70.56 Mb
PubMed search
- Wikidata
View/Edit Human	View/Edit Mouse

Ubiquitin carboxyl-terminal hydrolase MINDY-2 is an enzyme which in humans is encoded by the gene MINDY2 (previously FAM63B). MINDY-2 functions to remove ubiquitin from proteins (specifically 'Lys-48'-linked conjugated ubiquitin), and may be involved in regulating the turnover of proteins in cells.

== Gene ==
=== Locus ===
FAM63B is located at 15q21.3-q22.1, spanning 90,707 base pairs on chromosome 15.

=== Alternative Names ===
The full name of FAM63B is family with sequence similarity 63, member B. FAM63B is also listed by its alias, KIAA1164, in some publications.

== mRNA ==
=== Isoforms ===
The FAM63B gene encodes a primary transcript that can be alternatively spliced into 9 protein variants. FAM63B variant a is the most common isoform found in humans.

Variant	Length (amino acids)	Exon Count	Molecular Weight (kdal)	Isoelectric Point
a	621	9	67.1	4.24
b	620	9	67.0	4.24
x1	639	10	69.2	4.40
x2	638	10	69.1	4.40
x3	605	10	65.2	4.41
x4	587	9	63.1	4.25
x5	364	6	38.0	4.50
x6	351	8	40.2	4.72
x7	342	8	39.1	4.45

== Protein ==
=== Structure ===
Structure of FAM63B protein showing the domain of unknown function, bipartite tryptophan binding motif, hydrophobic stretchm, and KDEL signal.

==== Primary Structure ====
FAM63B is a member of the Pfam super family, and contains a domain of unknown function (DUF544) that is homologous within the protein family. FAM63B protein variant an also contains a bipartite tryptophan binding motif from W476 to W533. Variant a of the protein also contains a hydrophobic stretch of alanine from 567 to 574 and a mixed charge sequence from residue 598 to 617. FAM63B protein may contain a signal sequence specifying return to the endoplasmic reticulum (KDEL) from residue 607 to 621 in variant a.

==== Secondary Structure ====
The secondary structure of FAM63B is a combination of coils, some α-helices, and few β-sheets. The Phyre 2 program predicts α-helices in 23% of the protein, β-strands in 9% of the protein, and the remaining 59% of the protein as disordered. The disordered regions coincide with the coiled regions predicted by other programs, and this results in the long stretch of coiled protein beginning at the N-terminus. According to the SOUSI program, there is a 16-amino acid-long span from residues 265 to 280 of FAM63B that could be a transmembrane sequence. However, transmembrane sequences generally need to be at least 20 amino acids long in order to be stable in the membrane, so a transmembrane sequence is unlikely. Therefore, FAM63B is not fixed in the membrane of any organelle and is free to move through the cell and between organelles.

==== Tertiary Structure ====
Not much is known about the tertiary structure of FAM63B. A predicted folding is shown.

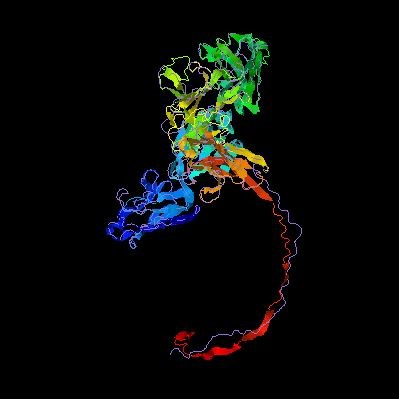
Predicted protein structure of FAM63B as determined by iTASSER.

=== Post-translational Modifications ===
Post-translational modifications of the FAM63B protein.

Post-translational Modification	Site(s)	Impact on Protein
Acetylation	Ser3	Stability, localization, metabolism, apoptosis, ribosome recognition for synthesis
Lysine Glycation	Lys88, Lys251, Lys280, Lys282, Lys332, Lys393, Lys398, Lys454, Lys547	Impaired function, changed characteristics
Phosphorylation	Ser7, Ser21, Ser25, Ser26, Ser62, Ser66, Ser68, Ser72, Ser90, Ser94, Ser111, Ser148, Ser153, Ser158, Ser160, Ser165, Ser170, Ser175, Ser188, Ser193, Ser233, Ser396, Ser440, Ser499, Ser541, Ser558, Ser587, Ser589, Ser590, Ser594, Ser597, Thr48, Thr255, Thr344, Thr453, Tyr505	Conformation change, turn enzymatic activity on/off
Picornaviral Cleavage	Glu195, Gln535	Cleavage of polyprotein, degradation
O-GlcNAc	Ser3, Ser21, Ser49, Ser62, Ser66, Ser68, Ser80, Ser152, Ser153, Ser158, Ser170, Ser499, Ser575, Ser587, Ser589, Ser590, Thr144, Thr576	Nucleocytoplasmic location

=== Subcellular Location ===
FAM63B has predicted NES (nuclear export signals) at Val274 and Leu277. Also, a NLS (nuclear localization signal) is predicted for FAM63B at RKRK at residue 599. In agreement, Reinhardt's method for cytoplasmic/nuclear discrimination predicts FAM63B to be located in the nucleus with a reliability of 76.7%. The presence of both NLS and NES signals and O-GlcNAc post-translational modification of FAM63B supports the protein's location in both the nucleus and cytoplasm and the discovered protein function as a shuttle for vaccinia virus between the nucleus and the cell periphery.

== Expression ==
=== Expression Level ===
FAM63B has moderately-high to high expression and is constitutively expressed. FAM63B is likely ubiquitously expressed in humans.

=== Differential Expression ===
Expression of FAM63B is high in the embryonic stem cells and differentiated tissues but low or off in embryoid bodies and other progenitor cells, such as the multipotent mesenchymal stem cells. It is likely that FAM63B is expressed during pluripotency and unipotency but is not important for differentiation, as is occurring in embryoid bodies, mesenchymal stem cells, and other progenitor cells.

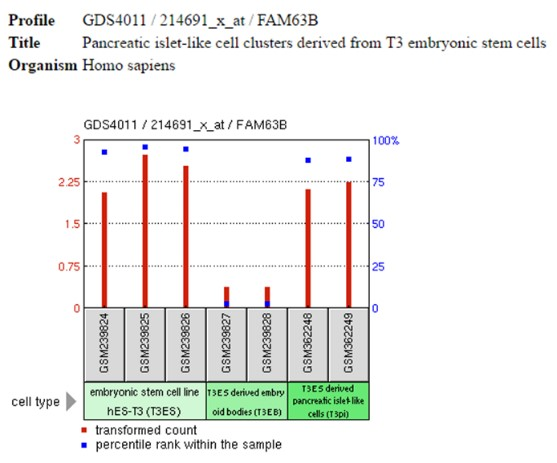
Differential FAM63B expression between human embryonic stem cells, hES-derived embryoid bodies, and hES-derived pancreatic cells.

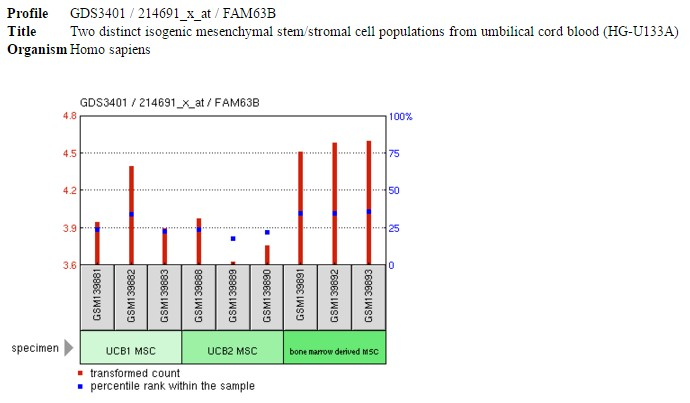
Differential FAM63B expression between stromal cells from umbilical cord blood and mesenchymal stem cells.

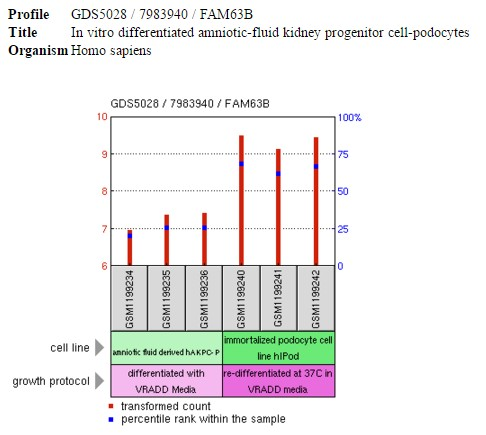
Differential FAM63B expression between amniotic fluid kidney-progenitor podocytes and differentiated podocytes.

Profiles from NCBI UniGene show the expression of FAM63B in stem cell, embryoid body, and differentiated tissues.

=== Regulation of Expression ===
==== Transcriptional Regulation ====
The promoter of FAM63B is GXP_5885, located on the positive strand of chromosome 15 from (58770692, 58771462) and is 711 base pairs long.

== Interacting Proteins ==
FAM63B is shown to interact with one protein, KLC-1. KLC-1, kinesin light chain 1, is a protein which recruits kinesin-1 via its cargo binding light chain and contains a bipartite tryptophan binding motif. This motif is present in a vaccinia virus integral membrane protein, A36, that is required for transport of the virus from the perinuclear space to the cell periphery. In the absence of A36, proteins with a bipartite tryptophan binding motif can interact with the kinesin light chain, recruit KLC-1, and promote virus transport from the nucleus to the cytoplasm.

== Function ==
The discovered function of FAM63B protein is a transporter of vaccinia virus in the human genome. FAM63B contains a bipartite tryptophan binding motif between W476 and W533. The motif also contains a Q residue at the +2 position, which was found to be a frequent occurrence in proteins that bind KLC-1 or KLC-2. FAM63B is among proteins studied that can rescue virus transport to the cell periphery when expressed in A36-deficient cells, successfully replacing the cytoplasmic domain A36 of vaccinia.

== Clinical Significance ==
=== Pathology ===
The specific pathology of FAM63B is unknown.

=== Disease Association ===
FAM63B is part of four networks regulated by miRNA, three of which are linked to neuronal differentiation and dopaminergic gene expression. These findings indicate that FAM63B could be used as a biomarker for the detection and treatment of schizophrenia. Furthermore, aberrant methylation of FAM63B may play a role in the development of schizophrenia. FAM63B has also been ranked 13 of 25 on a list of associated genes relevant to arthritis.

== Homology ==
=== Paralogs ===
FAM63B has one paralog, FAM63A, which is a gene of unknown function. FAM63A gene encodes a protein that is 469 amino acids long and 76% similar to FAM63B.

=== Orthologs ===
FAM63B has been found in all multicellular and unicellular eukaryotes, including plants but excluding protists and fungi. The gene has also been found in archaea but not bacteria.

Genus & species	Common name	Date of Divergence from Humans (MYA)	Accession number	Sequence length (amino acids) ! !Sequence similarity to Human Protein (%)	Clade	
Pan troglodytes	Chimpanzee	6.2	XP_510443.2	621	100	Mammalia
Microtus ochrogaster	Prairie vole	90.1	XP_005347720.1	597	84	Mammalia
Ursus maritimus	Polar bear	95	XP_008704293.1	591	97	Mammalia
Acinonyx jubatus	Cheetah	95	XP_014926357.1	488	96	Mammalia
Pelodiscus sinensis	Green sea turtle	320.5	XP_014434471.1	408	95	Reptilia
Zonotrichia albicollis	White-throated sparrow	320.5	XP_014123064.1	326	91	Aves
Columba livia	Rock dove	320.5	XP_005511195.1	340	91	Aves
Chrysemys picta bellii	Western painted turtle	320.5	XP_008162326.1	566	86	Reptilia
Melopsittacus undulatus	Budgerigar	320.5	XP_005145999.1	472	86	Aves
Xenopus tropicalis	Western clawed frog	354.4	XP_002937714.1	354	87	Amphibia
Latimeria chalumnae	Western Indian Ocean coelacanth	413.69	XP_005998789.1	652	83	Sarcopterygii
Lepisosteus oculatus	Spotted gar	436.8	XP_015198676.1	642	82	Actinopterygii
Hydra vulgaris	Hydra	902	XP_012556960.1	507	65	Hydrozoa
Octopus bimaculoides	California two-spot octopus	903	XP_014779548.1	981	58	Cephalopoda
Crassostrea gigas	Pacific oyster	903	XP_011440367.1	569	71	Bivalvia
Haemonchus contortus	Barber's pole worm	903	CDJ97151.1	437	55	Secernentea
Trichoplax adhaerens	Trichoplax	936	XP_002108532.1	308	75	Placozoa
Solanum pennellii	Tomato	1570.5	XP_015085752.1	686	65	Angiosperms
Sesamum indicum	Sesame	1570.5	XP_011071984.1	738	65	Angiosperms
Thermoplasmatales archaeon	BRNA1	4250	WP_048164282.1	1063	39	Archaea

=== Distant Homologs ===
The most distant homolog of FAM63B is found in Thermoplasmatales archaeon, an archaea that diverged from the human gene 4.25 billion years ago.

=== Homologous Domains ===
FAM63B is a member of the Pfam super family, and contains a domain of unknown function (DUF544) homologous within the protein family. This region of the protein is highly conserved through FAM63B homologs, as is the bipartite tryptophan binding motif of FAM63B and the C-terminus signal sequence.

=== Phylogeny ===
The phylogenetic tree below shows a time calibration for the evolution of FAM63B.

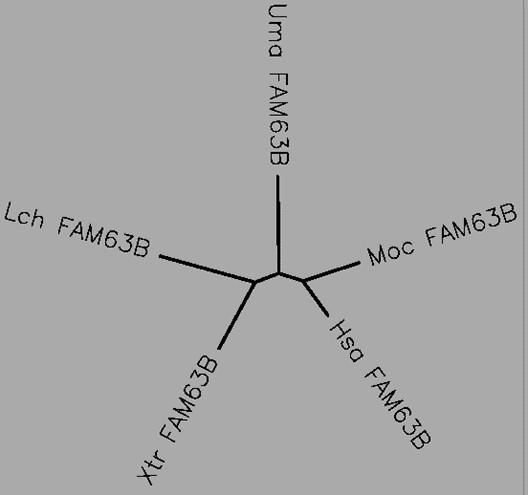
The phylogenetic tree from TimeTree shows a time calibration for the evolution of FAM63B among humans (Has), prairie voles (Moc), polar bears (Uma), Western clawed frogs (Xtr), and Western Indian Ocean coelacanth (Latimeria chalumnae, Lch). The fish is the most diverged, followed by the amphibian, and the mammals, especially humans, are the least diverged. This is as expected in accordance with the evolutionary history of organisms on Earth, and FAM63B shows no great exception to the rule.
