= CCK1 =

CCK1 may refer to:

- CCL28, chemokine
- Cholecystokinin A receptor, GPCR
