= PAIP2 =

Protein-coding gene in the species Homo sapiens

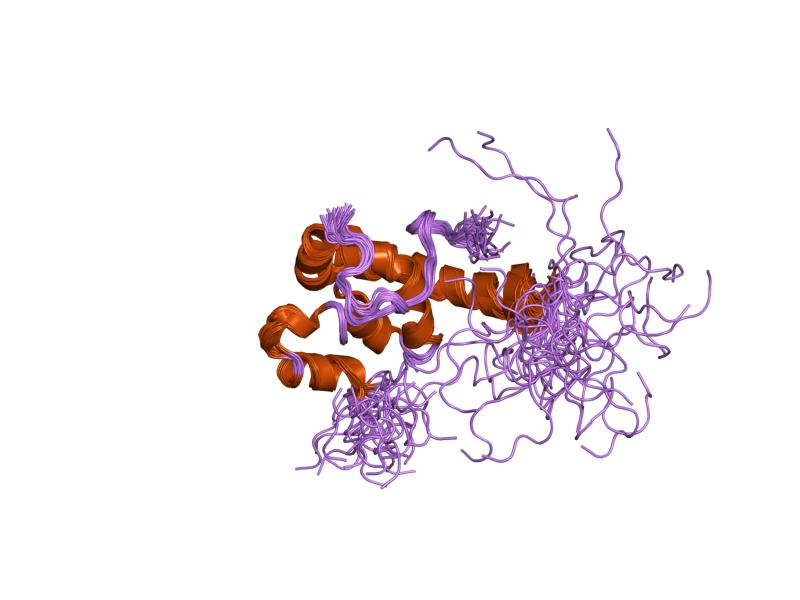
Available structures
PDB	Ortholog search: PDBe RCSB
PDB	List of PDB id codes 1JGN, 3KUS, 3KUT,%%s1JGN, 3KUS, 3KUT

Identifiers
- Aliases: PAIP2, PAIP-2, PAIP2A, poly(A) binding protein interacting protein 2
- External IDs: OMIM: 605604; MGI: 1915119; HomoloGene: 22978; GeneCards: PAIP2; OMA:PAIP2 - orthologs

Gene location (Human)
Chr.	Chromosome 5 (human)
Band	5q31.2	Start	139,341,587 bp
Band	5q31.2	End	139,369,720 bp

Gene location (Mouse)
Chr.	Chromosome 18 (mouse)
Band	18|18 B2	Start	35,731,670 bp
Band	18|18 B2	End	35,750,240 bp
RNA expression pattern
Bgee	Human / Mouse (ortholog); Top expressed in: cardiac muscle tissue of right atrium; myocardium of left ventricle; cerebellar vermis; pons; thymus; deltoid muscle; tibialis anterior muscle; cartilage tissue; postcentral gyrus; skin of arm / Top expressed in: saccule; otic placode; genital tubercle; medial ganglionic eminence; atrioventricular valve; blood; renal corpuscle; tail of embryo; medullary collecting duct; otic vesicle; More reference expression data
BioGPS	n/a
Gene ontology
Molecular function	protein binding; translation repressor activity, mRNA regulatory element binding; translation repressor activity; mRNA binding
Cellular component	cytoplasm
Biological process	negative regulation of translational initiation; regulation of translation; regulation of long-term synaptic potentiation; spermatogenesis; memory; negative regulation of translation
Sources:Amigo / QuickGO
Orthologs
Species	Human	Mouse
Entrez	51247	67869
Ensembl	ENSG00000120727	ENSMUSG00000037058
UniProt	Q9ULR5; Q6FID7; Q9BPZ3	Q9D6V8
RefSeq (mRNA)	NM_001033112; NM_016480	NM_026420; NM_001357470; NM_001357471; NM_001357472; NM_001357473
RefSeq (protein)	NP_065192; NP_001028284; NP_057564	NP_080696; NP_001344399; NP_001344400; NP_001344401; NP_001344402
Location (UCSC)	Chr 5: 139.34 – 139.37 Mb	Chr 18: 35.73 – 35.75 Mb
PubMed search
- Wikidata
View/Edit Human	View/Edit Mouse

Polyadenylate-binding protein-interacting protein 2 is a protein that in humans is encoded by the PAIP2 gene.

== Interactions ==
PAIP2 has been shown to interact with PABPC1.
