= RPS6KA1 =

Enzyme

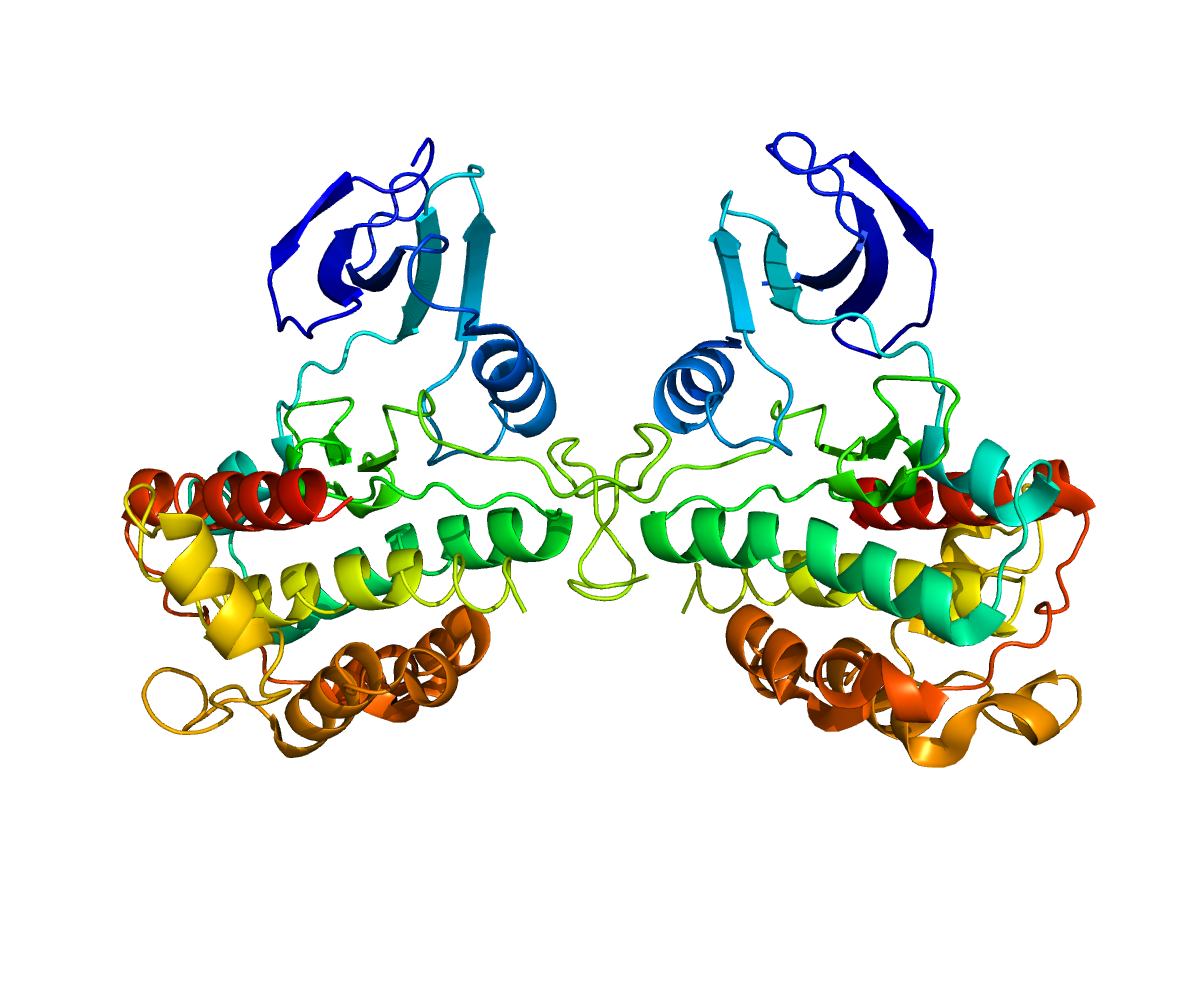

Identifiers
- Aliases: RPS6KA1, HU-1, MAPKAPK1A, RSK, RSK1, p90Rsk, ribosomal protein S6 kinase A1, MAPKAPK1
- External IDs: OMIM: 601684; MGI: 104558; GeneCards: RPS6KA1
Available structures
PDB	Ortholog search: PDBe RCSB
PDB	List of PDB id codes 2WNT, 2Z7Q, 2Z7R, 2Z7S, 3RNY, 4H3P, 4NIF, 5CSJ, 5CSF, 5CSN, 5CSI
Enzyme activity
EC #	BRENDA	ExPASy	KEGG	MetaCyc
2.7.11.1	↗	↗	↗	↗

Gene location (Human)
Chr.	Chromosome 1 (human)
Band	1p36.11	Start	26,529,761 bp
Band	1p36.11	End	26,575,030 bp

Gene location (Mouse)
Chr.	Chromosome 4 (mouse)
Band	4|4 D2.3	Start	133,574,601 bp
Band	4|4 D2.3	End	133,615,108 bp
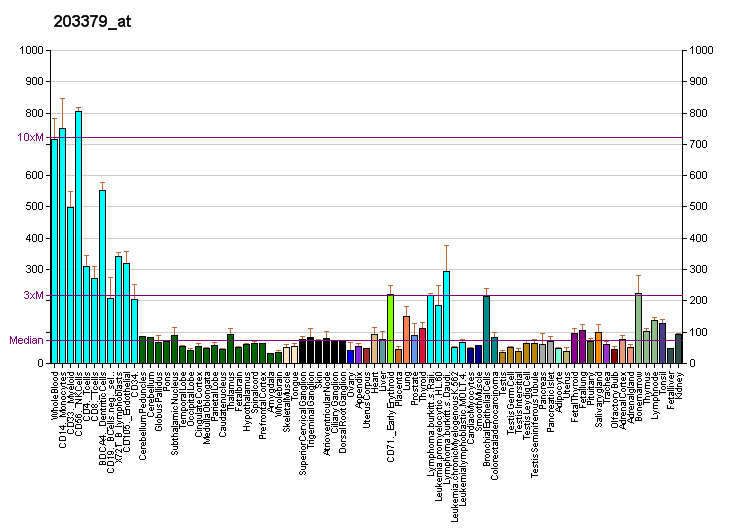
RNA expression pattern
Bgee	Human / Mouse (ortholog); Top expressed in: blood; granulocyte; mucosa of transverse colon; monocyte; duodenum; spleen; lymph node; appendix; rectum; bone marrow / Top expressed in: granulocyte; crypt of lieberkuhn of small intestine; duodenum; left colon; jejunum; ileum; vestibular membrane of cochlear duct; tibiofemoral joint; gastric mucosa; epithelium of stomach; More reference expression data
BioGPS	More reference expression data
Gene ontology
Molecular function	transferase activity; nucleotide binding; protein kinase activity; metal ion binding; cysteine-type endopeptidase inhibitor activity involved in apoptotic process; protein serine/threonine kinase activity; protein binding; protein serine/threonine/tyrosine kinase activity; ATP binding; magnesium ion binding; kinase activity; ribosomal protein S6 kinase activity
Cellular component	nucleoplasm; nucleus; cytoplasm; cytosol
Biological process	negative regulation of cysteine-type endopeptidase activity involved in apoptotic process; regulation of translation in response to stress; intracellular signal transduction; phosphorylation; negative regulation of apoptotic process; protein phosphorylation; positive regulation of cell growth; hepatocyte proliferation; positive regulation of cell differentiation; positive regulation of hepatic stellate cell activation; cell cycle; regulation of DNA-templated transcription in response to stress; signal transduction; positive regulation of transcription by RNA polymerase II; apoptotic process
Sources:Amigo / QuickGO
Orthologs
Databases	NCBI: entry; OMA: entry
Species	Human	Mouse
Entrez	6195	20111
Ensembl	ENSG00000117676; ENSG00000281877	ENSMUSG00000003644
UniProt	Q15418	P18653
RefSeq (mRNA)	NM_001006665; NM_002953; NM_001330441	NM_001285505; NM_001285506; NM_009097; NM_001378880
RefSeq (protein)	NP_001006666; NP_001317370; NP_002944	NP_001272434.1
Location (UCSC)	Chr 1: 26.53 – 26.58 Mb	Chr 4: 133.57 – 133.62 Mb
PubMed search
- Wikidata
View/Edit Human	View/Edit Mouse

Ribosomal protein S6 kinase alpha-1 is an enzyme that in humans is encoded by the RPS6KA1 gene.

== Function ==
This gene encodes a member of the RSK (ribosomal S6 kinase) family of serine/threonine kinases. This kinase contains 2 nonidentical kinase catalytic domains and phosphorylates various substrates, including members of the mitogen-activated kinase (MAPK) signalling pathway. The activity of this protein has been implicated in controlling cell growth and differentiation. Alternate transcriptional splice variants, encoding different isoforms, have been characterized.

== Interactions ==
RPS6KA1 has been shown to interact with:

- IκBα,
- MAPK1,
- TOB1
- TSC2, and
- YWHAB.

== See also ==
- Ribosomal s6 kinase
