= CNOT7 =

Protein-coding gene in the species Homo sapiens

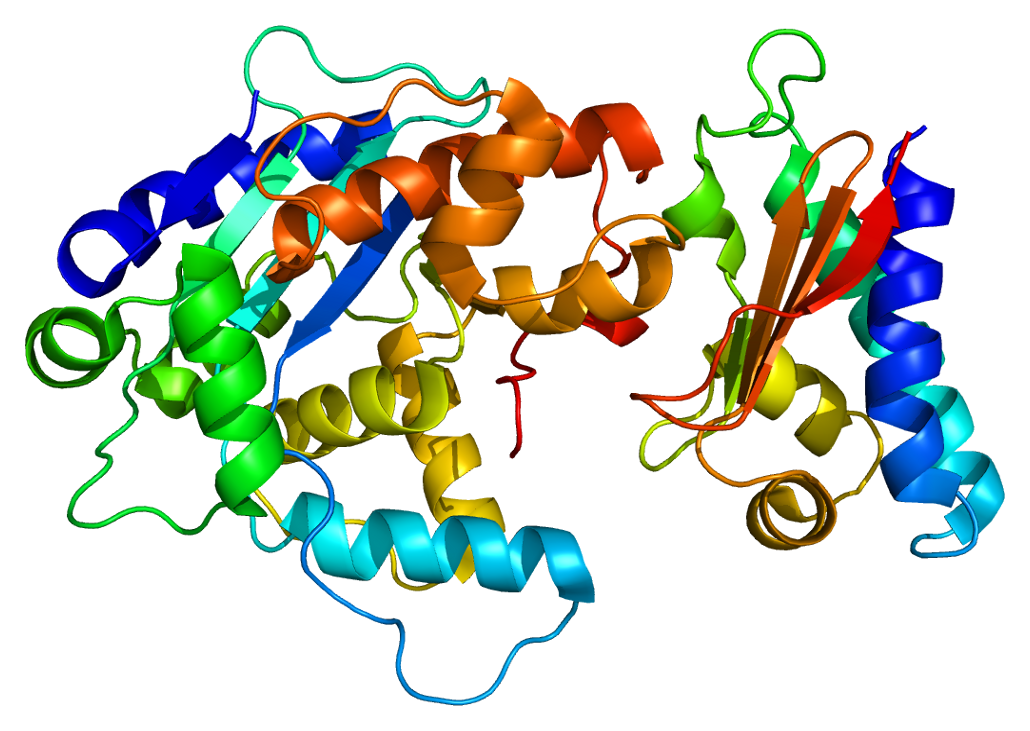

Identifiers
- Aliases: CNOT7, CAF1, Caf1a, hCAF-1, CAF-1, CCR4-NOT transcription complex subunit 7
- External IDs: OMIM: 604913; MGI: 1298230; GeneCards: CNOT7
Available structures
PDB	Ortholog search: PDBe RCSB
PDB	List of PDB id codes 2D5R, 4GMJ
Enzyme activity
EC #	BRENDA	ExPASy	KEGG	MetaCyc
3.1.13.4	↗	↗	↗	↗

Gene location (Human)
Chr.	Chromosome 8 (human)
Band	8p22	Start	17,224,966 bp
Band	8p22	End	17,246,878 bp

Gene location (Mouse)
Chr.	Chromosome 8 (mouse)
Band	8|8 A4	Start	40,945,581 bp
Band	8|8 A4	End	40,968,888 bp
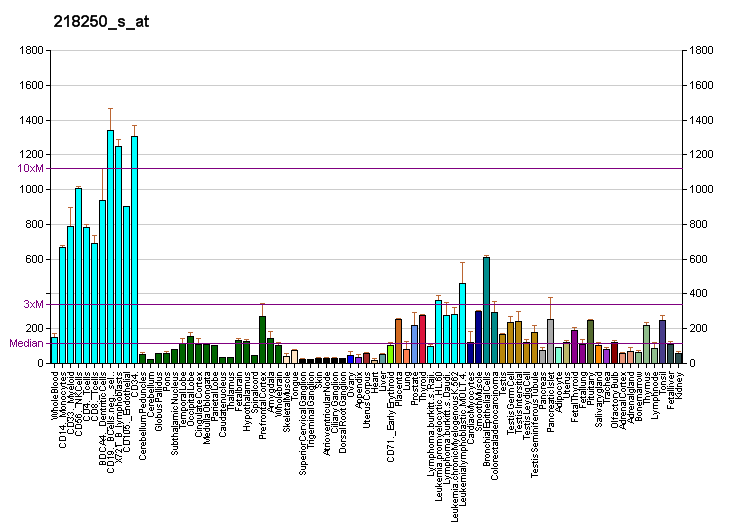
RNA expression pattern
Bgee	Human / Mouse (ortholog); Top expressed in: oocyte; buccal mucosa cell; corpus epididymis; secondary oocyte; germinal epithelium; Skeletal muscle tissue of biceps brachii; caput epididymis; parotid gland; Skeletal muscle tissue of rectus abdominis; tail of epididymis / Top expressed in: superior cervical ganglion; cumulus cell; medial ganglionic eminence; tail of embryo; secondary oocyte; genital tubercle; medullary collecting duct; dorsal striatum; ureter; abdominal wall; More reference expression data
BioGPS	More reference expression data
Gene ontology
Molecular function	nuclease activity; nucleic acid binding; exoribonuclease activity; protein binding; 3'-5'-exoribonuclease activity; signal transducer activity; poly(A)-specific ribonuclease activity; exonuclease activity; RNA binding; DNA-binding transcription factor activity; hydrolase activity; metal ion binding; transcription factor binding; transcription corepressor activity
Cellular component	nucleus; CCR4-NOT complex; cytosol; membrane; nuclear body; P-body; cytoplasm; nuclear speck; CCR4-NOT core complex; host cell PML body
Biological process	negative regulation of cell population proliferation; negative regulation of gene expression; exonucleolytic catabolism of deadenylated mRNA; deadenylation-dependent decapping of nuclear-transcribed mRNA; nucleic acid phosphodiester bond hydrolysis; P-body assembly; positive regulation of nuclear-transcribed mRNA catabolic process, deadenylation-dependent decay; regulation of transcription, DNA-templated; positive regulation of cell population proliferation; positive regulation of nuclear-transcribed mRNA poly(A) tail shortening; positive regulation of transcription by RNA polymerase II; positive regulation of mRNA catabolic process; gene silencing by miRNA; regulation of translation; nuclear-transcribed mRNA poly(A) tail shortening; signal transduction; gene silencing; transcription, DNA-templated; RNA phosphodiester bond hydrolysis, exonucleolytic; DNA damage response, signal transduction by p53 class mediator resulting in cell cycle arrest; negative regulation of transcription by RNA polymerase II; regulation of tyrosine phosphorylation of STAT protein; positive regulation of viral genome replication; negative regulation of transcription, DNA-templated; defense response to virus; negative regulation of type I interferon-mediated signaling pathway; carbohydrate metabolic process; negative regulation of translation
Sources:Amigo / QuickGO
Orthologs
Databases	NCBI: entry; OMA: entry
Species	Human	Mouse
Entrez	29883	18983
Ensembl	ENSG00000198791	ENSMUSG00000031601
UniProt	Q9UIV1	Q60809
RefSeq (mRNA)	NM_013354; NM_054026; NM_001322087; NM_001322088; NM_001322089 NM_001322090; NM_001322091; NM_001322092; NM_001322093; NM_001322094; NM_001322095; NM_001322096; NM_001322097; NM_001322098; NM_001322099; NM_001322100	NM_001271542; NM_001271543; NM_011135; NM_001361938; NM_001361939
RefSeq (protein)	NP_001309016; NP_001309017; NP_001309018; NP_001309019; NP_001309020 NP_001309021; NP_001309022; NP_001309023; NP_001309024; NP_001309025; NP_001309026; NP_001309027; NP_001309028; NP_001309029; NP_037486; NP_473367	NP_001258471; NP_001258472; NP_035265; NP_001348867; NP_001348868
Location (UCSC)	Chr 8: 17.22 – 17.25 Mb	Chr 8: 40.95 – 40.97 Mb
PubMed search
- Wikidata
View/Edit Human	View/Edit Mouse

CCR4-NOT transcription complex subunit 7 is a protein that in humans is encoded by the CNOT7 gene. It is a subunit of the CCR4-Not deadenylase complex.

== Function ==
The protein encoded by this gene binds to an anti-proliferative protein, B-cell translocation protein 1, which negatively regulates cell proliferation. Binding of the two proteins, which is driven by phosphorylation of the anti-proliferative protein, causes signaling events in cell division that lead to changes in cell proliferation associated with cell-cell contact. The protein has both mouse and yeast orthologs. Alternate splicing of this gene results in two transcript variants encoding different isoforms.

== Interactions ==
CNOT7 has been shown to interact with:

- BTG1,
- PABPC1,
- TOB1, and
- TOB2.
