= HOXB9 =

Protein-coding gene in humans

Identifiers
- Aliases: HOXB9, HOX-2.5, HOX2, HOX2E, homeobox B9
- External IDs: OMIM: 142964; MGI: 96190; GeneCards: HOXB9

Gene location (Human)
Chr.	Chromosome 17 (human)
Band	17q21.32	Start	48,621,156 bp
Band	17q21.32	End	48,626,358 bp

Gene location (Mouse)
Chr.	Chromosome 11 (mouse)
Band	11 D|11 59.81 cM	Start	96,162,283 bp
Band	11 D|11 59.81 cM	End	96,167,421 bp
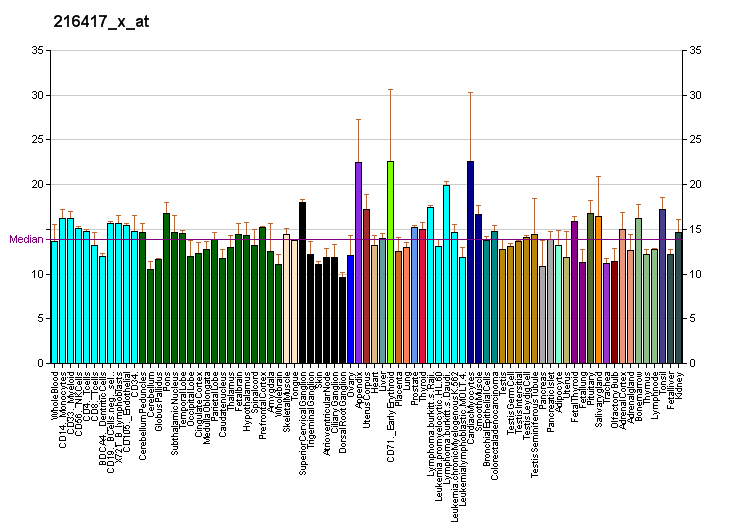
RNA expression pattern
Bgee	Human / Mouse (ortholog); Top expressed in: mucosa of transverse colon; corpus epididymis; rectum; buccal mucosa cell; mucosa of sigmoid colon; caput epididymis; gonad; testicle; mucosa of ileum; human kidney / Top expressed in: tail of embryo; lumbar subsegment of spinal cord; somite; adrenal gland; genital tubercle; urethra; male urethra; right kidney; neural tube; seminal vesicula; More reference expression data
BioGPS	More reference expression data
Gene ontology
Molecular function	sequence-specific DNA binding; DNA binding; protein binding; RNA polymerase II transcription regulatory region sequence-specific DNA binding; DNA-binding transcription factor activity, RNA polymerase II-specific
Cellular component	nucleus; mitochondrion; nucleoplasm; RNA polymerase II transcription regulator complex
Biological process	cell chemotaxis; canonical Wnt signaling pathway; multicellular organism development; regulation of transcription, DNA-templated; transcription, DNA-templated; anterior/posterior pattern specification; positive regulation of transcription by RNA polymerase II; embryonic skeletal system development; mammary gland development
Sources:Amigo / QuickGO
Orthologs
Databases	NCBI: entry; OMA: entry
Species	Human	Mouse
Entrez	3219	15417
Ensembl	ENSG00000170689	ENSMUSG00000020875
UniProt	P17482	P20615
RefSeq (mRNA)	NM_024017	NM_008270
RefSeq (protein)	NP_076922	NP_032296
Location (UCSC)	Chr 17: 48.62 – 48.63 Mb	Chr 11: 96.16 – 96.17 Mb
PubMed search
- Wikidata
View/Edit Human	View/Edit Mouse

Homeobox protein Hox-B9 is a protein that in humans is encoded by the HOXB9 gene.

== Function ==
This gene is a member of the Abd-B homeobox family and encodes a protein with a homeobox DNA-binding domain. It is included in a cluster of homeobox B genes located on chromosome 17. The encoded nuclear protein functions as a sequence-specific transcription factor that is involved in cell proliferation and differentiation. Increased expression of this gene is associated with some cases of leukemia, prostate cancer and lung cancer.

== Interactions ==
HOXB9 has been shown to interact with BTG2 and BTG1.

== See also ==
- Homeobox
