= PABPC1 =

Protein-coding gene in humans

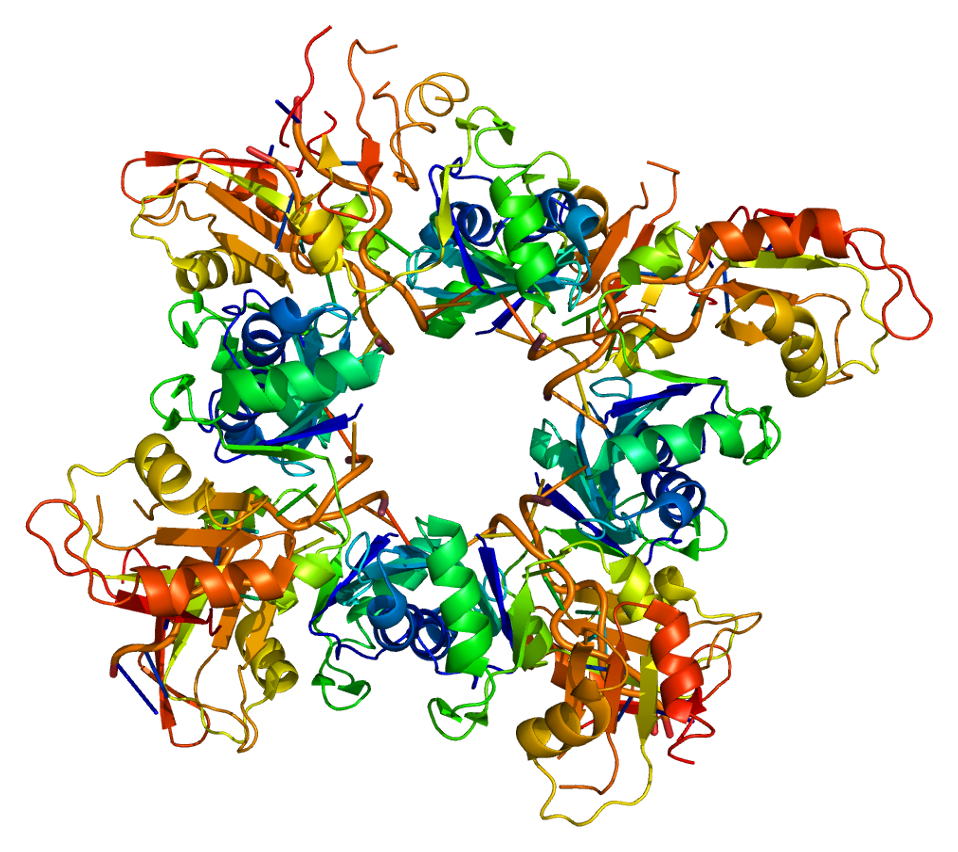

Identifiers
- Aliases: PABPC1, PAB1, PABP, PABP1, PABPC2, PABPL1, poly(A) binding protein cytoplasmic 1
- External IDs: OMIM: 604679; MGI: 1349722; GeneCards: PABPC1
Available structures
PDB	Ortholog search: PDBe RCSB
PDB	List of PDB id codes 1CVJ, 1G9L, 1JGN, 1JH4, 2K8G, 2RQG, 2RQH, 2X04, 3KTP, 3KTR, 3KUI, 3KUJ, 3KUR, 3KUS, 3KUT, 3PKN, 3PTH, 4F02, 4F25, 4F26, 5DX1, 5DXA, 5DX8, 2D9P

Gene location (Human)
Chr.	Chromosome 8 (human)
Band	8q22.3	Start	100,685,816 bp
Band	8q22.3	End	100,722,809 bp

Gene location (Mouse)
Chr.	Chromosome 15 (mouse)
Band	15|15 B3.1	Start	36,595,905 bp
Band	15|15 B3.1	End	36,609,912 bp
RNA expression pattern
Bgee	Human / Mouse (ortholog); Top expressed in: parotid gland; pylorus; gonad; amniotic fluid; vulva; tonsil; nipple; trabecular bone; monocyte; oral cavity / Top expressed in: tail of embryo; genital tubercle; ventricular zone; yolk sac; spermatocyte; morula; neural layer of retina; spermatid; embryo; lip; More reference expression data
BioGPS	n/a
Gene ontology
Molecular function	protein binding; nucleic acid binding; protein C-terminus binding; translation activator activity; poly(U) RNA binding; poly(A) binding; mRNA 3'-UTR binding; RNA binding; mRNA binding
Cellular component	focal adhesion; catalytic step 2 spliceosome; cytoplasmic stress granule; cytoplasm; cytoplasmic ribonucleoprotein granule; spliceosomal complex; membrane; extracellular exosome; nucleus; cytosol; dendrite; ribonucleoprotein granule; synapse; messenger ribonucleoprotein complex; ribonucleoprotein complex
Biological process	nuclear-transcribed mRNA catabolic process, nonsense-mediated decay; mRNA stabilization; mRNA splicing, via spliceosome; regulation of mRNA stability; RNA splicing; mRNA polyadenylation; mRNA processing; nuclear-transcribed mRNA poly(A) tail shortening; positive regulation of viral genome replication; translational initiation; negative regulation of nuclear-transcribed mRNA catabolic process, nonsense-mediated decay; positive regulation of translation; gene silencing; positive regulation of nuclear-transcribed mRNA poly(A) tail shortening; positive regulation of nuclear-transcribed mRNA catabolic process, deadenylation-dependent decay
Sources:Amigo / QuickGO
Orthologs
Databases	NCBI: entry; OMA: entry
Species	Human	Mouse
Entrez	26986	18458
Ensembl	ENSG00000070756	ENSMUSG00000022283
UniProt	P11940	P29341
RefSeq (mRNA)	NM_002568	NM_008774
RefSeq (protein)	NP_002559	NP_032800
Location (UCSC)	Chr 8: 100.69 – 100.72 Mb	Chr 15: 36.6 – 36.61 Mb
PubMed search
- Wikidata
View/Edit Human	View/Edit Mouse

Polyadenylate-binding protein 1 is a protein that in humans is encoded by the PABPC1 gene. The protein PABP1 binds mRNA and facilitates a variety of functions such as transport into and out of the nucleus, degradation, translation, and stability. There are two separate PABP1 proteins, one which is located in the nucleus (PABPN1) and the other which is found in the cytoplasm (PABPC1). The location of PABP1 affects the role of that protein and its function with RNA.

== Function ==
The poly(A)-binding protein (PAB or PABP), which is found complexed to the 3' poly(A) tail of eukaryotic mRNA, is required for poly(A) lengthening and the termination of translation. In humans, the PABPs comprise a small nuclear isoform and a conserved gene family of other poly(A)-binding proteins.

PABPC1 is usually diffused within the cytoplasm and concentrated at sites of high mRNA concentration such as stress granules, processing bodies, and locations of high translational activity. PABPC1 is also associated with nonsense-mediated mRNA decay (NMD). PABPC1 binds to the poly(A) tail and interact with eIF4G, which stabilizes the circularization of mRNAs. This structure is required for the prevention of mRNA degradation via NMD.

In the nucleus PABP1 binds to the poly(A) tails of pre-mRNAs to facilitate stability, export, transport, and degradation. PABP1 binding is also required for Nonsense-mediated decay. PABPC1 contains four RNA-recognition motifs (RRMs). The first two, RRM1 and RRM2, bind both α-importin and the poly(A) tail of processed mRNA. This feature prevents mRNA from going back into the nucleus.

== Interactions ==
PABPC1 has been shown to interact with:

- ANAPC5,
- CNOT7,
- EIF4G3,
- EIF4G1,
- GSPT2,
- PAIP1, and
- PAIP2.
