= PRMT1 =

Protein-coding gene in the species Homo sapiens

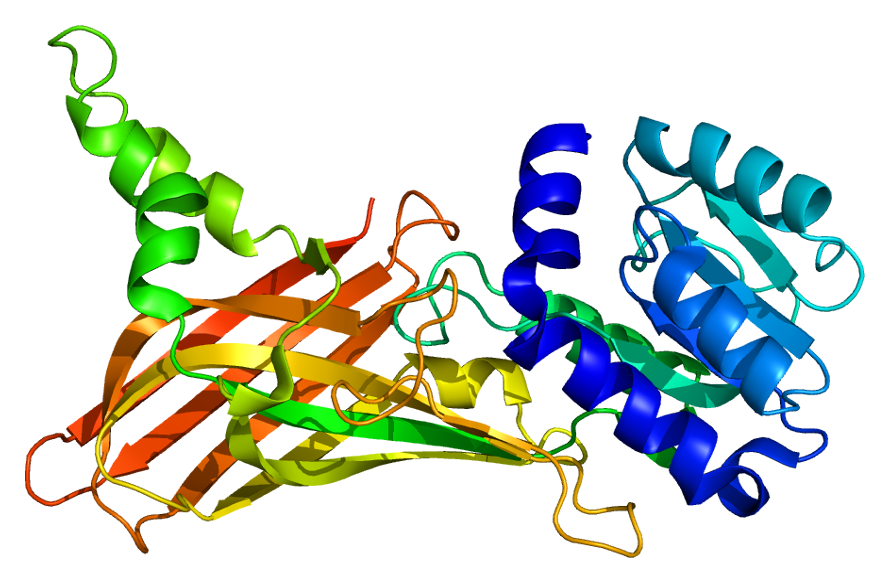

Identifiers
- Aliases: PRMT1, ANM1, HCP1, HRMT1L2, IR1B4, protein arginine methyltransferase 1
- External IDs: OMIM: 602950; MGI: 107846; GeneCards: PRMT1
Enzyme activity
EC #	BRENDA	ExPASy	KEGG	MetaCyc
2.1.1.319	↗	↗	↗	↗
2.1.1.321	↗	↗	↗	↗

Gene location (Human)
Chr.	Chromosome 19 (human)
Band	19q13.33	Start	49,675,786 bp
Band	19q13.33	End	49,689,029 bp

Gene location (Mouse)
Chr.	Chromosome 7 (mouse)
Band	7 B3|7 29.07 cM	Start	44,625,413 bp
Band	7 B3|7 29.07 cM	End	44,635,992 bp
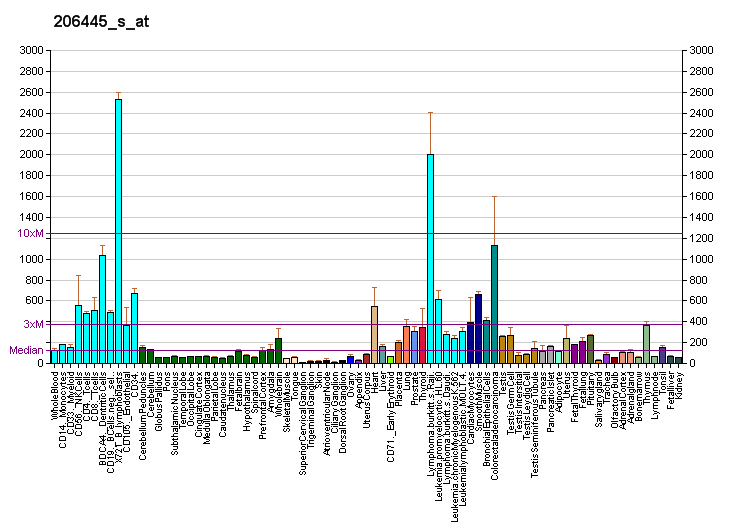
RNA expression pattern
Bgee	Human / Mouse (ortholog); Top expressed in: embryo; right uterine tube; ganglionic eminence; anterior pituitary; body of uterus; canal of the cervix; muscle of thigh; right hemisphere of cerebellum; left uterine tube; right ovary / Top expressed in: abdominal wall; mandibular prominence; ventricular zone; maxillary prominence; medial ganglionic eminence; hand; yolk sac; somite; dermis; tail of embryo; More reference expression data
BioGPS	More reference expression data
Gene ontology
Molecular function	methyltransferase activity; histone methyltransferase activity; transferase activity; histone methyltransferase activity (H4-R3 specific); methyl-CpG binding; mitogen-activated protein kinase p38 binding; protein binding; identical protein binding; enzyme binding; N-methyltransferase activity; protein-arginine omega-N asymmetric methyltransferase activity; RNA binding; protein methyltransferase activity; protein-arginine N-methyltransferase activity; histone-arginine N-methyltransferase activity; protein-arginine omega-N monomethyltransferase activity; S-adenosyl-L-methionine binding
Cellular component	cytoplasm; nucleoplasm; methylosome; nucleus; cytosol
Biological process	positive regulation of p38MAPK cascade; positive regulation of hemoglobin biosynthetic process; histone H4-R3 methylation; positive regulation of erythrocyte differentiation; negative regulation of megakaryocyte differentiation; cell surface receptor signaling pathway; methylation; peptidyl-arginine methylation; histone methylation; neuron projection development; peptidyl-arginine N-methylation; peptidyl-arginine methylation, to asymmetrical-dimethyl arginine; DNA damage response, signal transduction by p53 class mediator resulting in cell cycle arrest; regulation of transcription, DNA-templated; protein methylation; positive regulation of cell population proliferation; regulation of megakaryocyte differentiation; in utero embryonic development; histone arginine methylation; protein homooligomerization
Sources:Amigo / QuickGO
Orthologs
Databases	NCBI: entry; OMA: entry
Species	Human	Mouse
Entrez	3276	15469
Ensembl	ENSG00000126457	ENSMUSG00000109324
UniProt	Q99873	Q9JIF0
RefSeq (mRNA)	NM_001207042; NM_001536; NM_198318; NM_198319	NM_001252476; NM_001252477; NM_019830
RefSeq (protein)	NP_001193971; NP_001527; NP_938074	NP_001239405; NP_001239406; NP_062804
Location (UCSC)	Chr 19: 49.68 – 49.69 Mb	Chr 7: 44.63 – 44.64 Mb
PubMed search
- Wikidata
View/Edit Human	View/Edit Mouse

Protein arginine N-methyltransferase 1 is an enzyme that in humans is encoded by the PRMT1 gene. The HRMT1L2 gene encodes a protein arginine methyltransferase that functions as a histone methyltransferase specific for histone H4.

== Function ==
PRMT1 gene encodes for the protein arginine methyltransferase that functions as a histone methyltransferase specific for histone H4 in eukaryotic cells. Specifically altering histone H4 in eukaryotes gives it the ability to remodel chromatin acting as a post-translational modifier.

Through regulation of gene expression, arginine methyltransferases control the cell cycle and death of eukaryotic cells.

== Reaction pathway ==
While all PRMT enzymes catalyze the methylation of arginine residues in proteins, PRMT1 is unique in that is catalyzes the formation of asymmetric dimethylarginine as opposed to the PRMT2 that catalyzes the formation of symmetric dimethylarginine. Individual PRMT utilize S-adenosyl-L-methionine (SAM) as the methyl donor and catalyze methyl group transfer to the ω-nitrogen of an arginine residue.

== Clinical significance ==
In humans, these enzymes regulate gene expression and hence are involved in pathogenesis of many human diseases. Using enzyme inhibitors for arginine methyltransferase 1, studies were able to demonstrate the enzyme's potential as an early catalyst of various cancers.

== Interactions ==
PRMT1 has been shown to interact with:

- BTG1,
- BTG2,
- DHX9,
- FUS,
- HNRNPR,
- HNRPK,
- IFNAR1,
- ILF3,
- KHDRBS1, and
- SUPT5H.
