= MINDY1 =

Protein-coding gene in humans

Identifiers
- Aliases: MINDY1, FAM63A, MINDY lysine 48 deubiquitinase 1, MINDY-1
- External IDs: OMIM: 618407; MGI: 1922257; GeneCards: MINDY1
Available structures
| PDB | Ortholog search: PDBe RCSB |
| PDB | List of PDB id codes 5JKN, 5JQS |
Enzyme activity
| EC # | BRENDA | ExPASy | KEGG | MetaCyc |
|---|---|---|---|---|
| 3.4.19.12 | ↗ | ↗ | ↗ | ↗ |

Gene location (Human)
| Chr. | Chromosome 1 (human) |
| Band | 1q21.3 | Start | 150,996,549 bp |
| Band | 1q21.3 | End | 151,008,376 bp |

Gene location (Mouse)
| Chr. | Chromosome 3 (mouse) |
| Band | 3|3 F2.1 | Start | 95,188,656 bp |
| Band | 3|3 F2.1 | End | 95,203,477 bp |
RNA expression pattern
| Bgee | Human / Mouse (ortholog); Top expressed in: body of pancreas; apex of heart; right lobe of thyroid gland; C1 segment; left lobe of thyroid gland; blood; right auricle of heart; tibial nerve; left ventricle; monocyte / Top expressed in: primary oocyte; granulocyte; secondary oocyte; lacrimal gland; zygote; Rostral migratory stream; left lobe of liver; conjunctival fornix; gastric mucosa; epithelium of stomach; More reference expression data |
| BioGPS | n/a |
Gene ontology
| Molecular function | protein binding; cysteine-type carboxypeptidase activity; thiol-dependent deubiquitinase; peptidase activity; cysteine-type peptidase activity; hydrolase activity; Lys48-specific deubiquitinase activity; K48-linked polyubiquitin modification-dependent protein binding |
| Cellular component | nucleus; nucleoplasm; nuclear body; cytosol |
| Biological process | protein K48-linked deubiquitination; proteolysis; biological process |
Sources:Amigo / QuickGO
Orthologs
| Databases | NCBI: entry; OMA: entry |
| Species | Human | Mouse |
| Entrez | 55793 | 75007 |
| Ensembl | ENSG00000143409 | ENSMUSG00000038712 |
| UniProt | Q8N5J2 | Q76LS9 |
| RefSeq (mRNA) | NM_001040217; NM_001163258; NM_001163259; NM_001163260; NM_018379 NM_001319998; NM_001376664; NM_001376665; NM_001376666; NM_001376667; NM_001376668; NM_001376669; NM_001376670; NM_001376671; NM_001376672; NM_001376673; NM_001376674 | NM_133858; NM_199475 |
| RefSeq (protein) | NP_001035307; NP_001156730; NP_001156731; NP_001156732; NP_001306927 NP_060849; NP_001363593; NP_001363594; NP_001363595; NP_001363596; NP_001363597; NP_001363598; NP_001363599; NP_001363600; NP_001363601; NP_001363602; NP_001363603 | NP_598619; NP_955769 |
| Location (UCSC) | Chr 1: 151 – 151.01 Mb | Chr 3: 95.19 – 95.2 Mb |
| PubMed search |
- Wikidata
| View/Edit Human | View/Edit Mouse |

Ubiquitin carboxyl-terminal hydrolase MINDY-1, also known as family with sequence similarity 63, member A (FAM63A) is a protein that, is encoded by the MINDY1 gene in humans. It is located on the minus strand of chromosome 1 at locus 1q21.3.

Evolutionarily, FAM63A orthologs are found in most vertebrates, and distant homologs of FAM63A are found in invertebrates. FAM63A is ubiquitously expressed throughout human tissues, and it is present during every stage of development.

It has been linked to a biomarker in chronic kidney disease and Alzheimer's disease.

== Gene ==
=== Locus ===
FAM63A is located on the minus strand of chromosome 1 at band 1q21.3, spanning 11,829 bp. Other genes surrounding FAM63A include ANXA9 and Prune.

=== Aliases ===
FAM63A has two aliases KIAA1390 and PR11-316M1.5.

== mRNA ==
=== Primary structure ===
In humans, there are four isoforms of FAM63A, and there are 10 predicted isoforms. Isoform 1 of FAM63A has a molecular weight of 51.8 kilodaltons, and it contains 11 exons. The different isoforms tend to differ at the 5' or 3' end by truncation. Transcription produces 23 introns, 14 spliced variants, and 6 unspliced forms.

== Protein ==
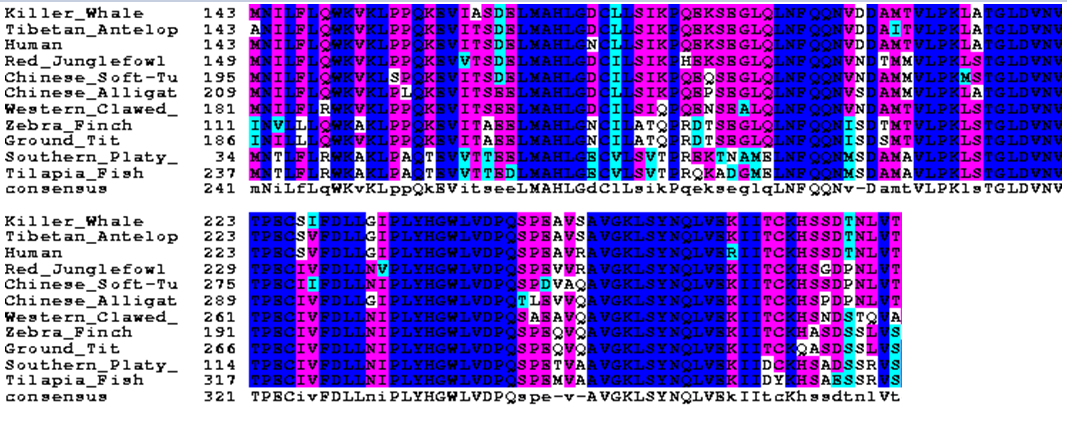
Multiple sequence alignment of DUF demonstrating conservation across orthologs. Dark blue indicates complete conservation, pink identical residues, and light blue chemical similarity.

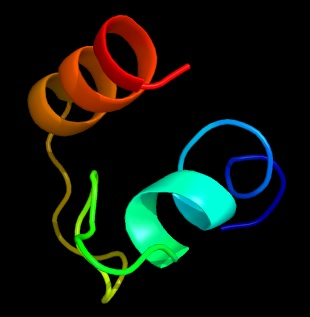
This is a 3D depiction of the probable secondary structure of FAM63A.

=== Domains and motifs ===
FAM63A contains a domain of unknown function (DUF 544). DUF544 contains 125 amino acids, running from Met143 to Thr267. Although not completely conserved, this domain is highly conserved across vertebrates, invertebrates, and plants. FAM63A does not contain a transmembrane domain, and it is found primarily in nuclear regions of the cell.

Two repeats of four glutamines are seen from amino acid 400–403 and from amino acid 426–429, leading to an elevated glutamine composition at the C-terminus.

=== Composition ===
FAM63A is composed of 469 amino acids. There is an increased presence of glutamine found near the C terminus making FAM63A glutamine rich. FAM63A contains a greater amount of negatively charged (acidic) amino acids than positively charged (basic) amino acids which makes FAM63A a slightly acidic protein. Acidic amino acids such as aspartic acid and glutamic acid are more prevalent than the basic amino acids such as lysine and arginine. This overall acidic composition gives FAM63A an acidic isoelectric point of 4.6.

=== Post-translational modifications ===
FAM63A contains 25 phosphorylation sites in humans, including 12 serine, 10 threonine, and 3 tyrosine. Additionally, there are 5 N-myristoylation sites, and there is 1 prenylation site. FAM63A contains no glycosylation sites, transmembrane domains, or signal peptides.

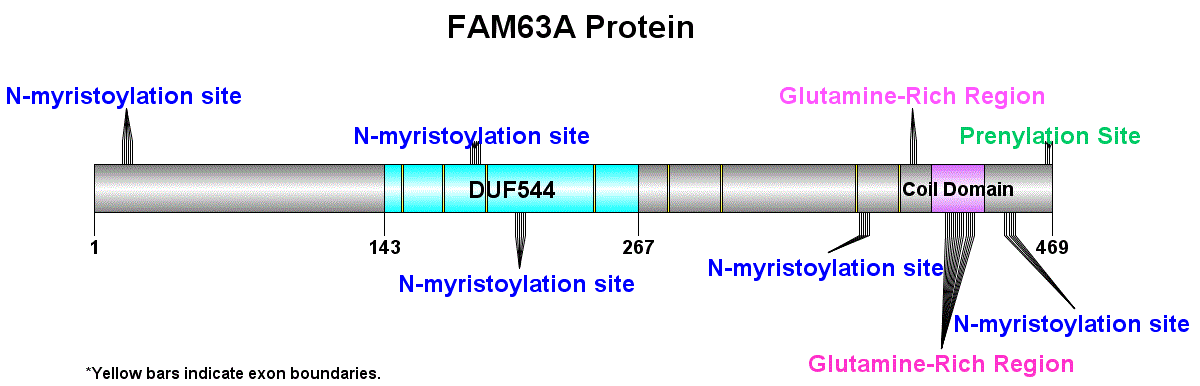
This is a depiction of the posttranslational modifications in FAM63A.

=== Secondary structure ===
The secondary structure for FAM63A has not been explicitly determined. There are, however, predictions for a possible secondary structure. There is a coiled-coil domain at the end of the protein, and in the predicted secondary structure, there is an alpha helix between amino acids 410 and 436. This helix is conserved throughout more distant orthologs of FAM63A. These data support each other, and it gives a confident prediction of the secondary structure.

=== Interacting proteins ===
The following genes have interactions with FAM63A: GSPT2, NAA38, RNMT, CSNIK1G2, ACOX1, PSMC1, SLC25A37, MMS19, DIAPH1, ME1, GAPDH, UBC. After performing a yeast two-hybrid screen, it was found that NAA38 and FAM63A interact.

== Homology/evolution ==
In FAM63A, there are several amino acids that are conserved in all vertebrates for which sequences are available. Gly239 is the only amino acid that is conserved in all vertebrates, invertebrates, and plants for which sequences are available. Because there is only one amino acid that is absolutely conserved, a possible function for the conserved Glycine was not deduced. The 25 amino acid sequence ranging from Val313 to Gly338 is the most highly conserved in all vertebrates, invertebrates, and plants for which sequences are available. Although the sequence is not absolutely conserved, it is very highly conserved, even in the most distantly related organisms like fungi and plants.

=== Orthologs ===
The protein FAM63A has several strict orthologs. These strict orthologs are found in organisms ranging from primates to fish.

| Scientific name | Common name | Divergence | Accession number | Length | Identity | Similarity | Query Cover |
|---|---|---|---|---|---|---|---|
| Homo sapiens | Humans | N/A | NP_060849.2 | 469 aa | 100% | 100% | 100% |
| Pan paniscus | Bonobo | 6.1 MYA | XP_003817322.1 | 469 aa | 99.1% | 99.4% | 100% |
| Mus musculus | House Mouse | 91.0 MYA | NP_955769.1 | 468 aa | 86.0% | 90.2% | 100% |
| Bos taurus | Cow | 97.4 MYA | NP_001039389.1 | 469 aa | 85.6% | 88.5% | 100% |
| Trichechus manatus latirostris | West Indian Manatee | 104.7 MYA | XP_004389621.1 | 465 aa | 84.9% | 89.8% | 100% |
| Sarcophilus harrisii | Tasmanian Devil | 176.1 MYA | XP_003769968.1 | 464 aa | 78.3% | 82.9% | 100% |
| Taeniopygia guttata | Zebra Finch | 324.0 MYA | XP_002191502.2 | 335 aa | 43.2% | 80.1% | 53% |
| Gallus gallus | Chicken | 324.5 MYA | XP_003642724 | 462 aa | 66.9% | 76.1% | 92% |
| Chrysemys picta bellii | Painted Turtle | 324.5 MYA | XP_005293753.1 | 525 aa | 62.0% | 87.2% | 78% |
| Pelodiscus sinensis | Chinese Softshell Turtle | 324.5 MYA | XP_006119467.1 | 502 aa | 61.6% | 77.4% | 94% |
| Alligator mississippiensis | American Alligator | 324.5 MYA | XP_006274676.1 | 520 aa | 59.90% | 77.50% | 86% |
| Pseudopodoces humilis | Ground Tit | 324.5 MYA | XP_005533539.1 | 502 aa | 58.0% | 82.3% | 78% |
| Anas platyrhynchos | Mallard | 324.5 MYA | XP_005026841.1 | 415 aa | 57.9% | 78.6% | 83% |
| Xenopus tropicalis | Western Clawed Frog | 361.2 MYA | XP_002937311.1 | 506 aa | 61.3% | 83.7% | 76% |
| Latimeria chalumnae | West Indian Ocean Coelacanth | 430.0 MYA | XP_006006147.1 | 513 aa | 44.7% | 86.9% | 55% |
| Danio rerio | Zebrafish | 454.6 MYA | XP_005159508.1 | 520 aa | 52.2% | 80.2% | 76% |

FAM63A evolved through time at a relatively moderate rate.

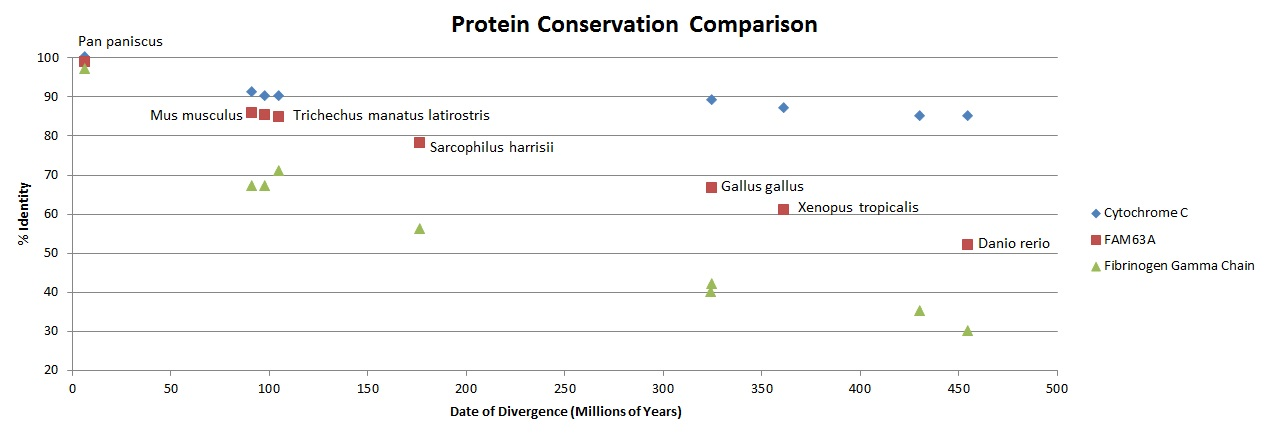
This shows the protein conservation throughout evolution. FAM63A evolved at a medium rate compared with cytochrome c (fast) and fibrinogen (slow).

=== Paralogs ===
The protein FAM63A has only one known paralog: FAM63B. FAM63B is predicted as having a molecular function in the cell. All of the vertebrates for which sequences are available have two copies of the FAM63 gene, both A and B. FAM63A and FAM63B likely split apart around 666 million years ago, as the closest relative to Homo sapiens containing only one FAM63 is a tapeworm, which diverged 666 million years ago.

| Sequence Number | Scientific name | Common name | Divergence | Accession number | Length | Identity | Similarity | Query Cover | E-value |
|---|---|---|---|---|---|---|---|---|---|
| protein FAM63B isoform a | Homo sapiens | Human | N/A | NP_001035540.1 | 621 aa | 41.9% | 76.7% | 68% | 2.00E-129 |

== Expression ==
=== Promoter ===
The promoter region contains a number of transcription factors. Those with high scores include estrogen response elements, TATA boxes, glucocorticoid response elements, and Ccaat/enhancer binding proteins. Experimental data reveals that FAM63A expression decreases when the estrogen receptor is not present, suggesting that the estrogen response elements may serve as an important promoter regulatory mechanism for this protein.

=== Protein expression ===
FAM63A is a protein that is ubiquitously expressed across human tissues and throughout development. Although FAM63A is expressed ubiquitously, there are certain tissues that have higher levels of expression including the heart, thyroid, ganglia, and blood.

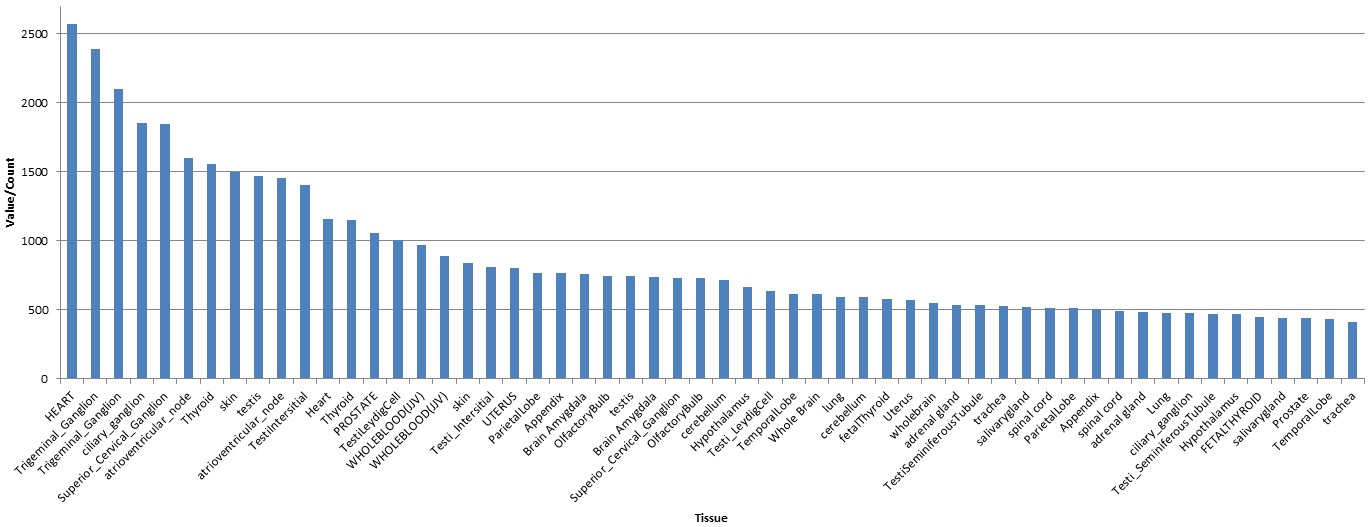
This is a depiction of the expression levels of FAM63A throughout different human tissues.

== Clinical significance ==
Although there is no specific function determined for FAM63A, there are a few researchers who have discovered possible functions. It has been postulated that FAM63A may be associated with renal function and chronic kidney disease.

Figgins, Minster, and Demirci examined 17,343 functional single nucleotide polymorphisms, demonstrating a strong association between Alzheimer's disease duration and FAM63A. Another gene located on 1q21, CTSS, was also strongly associated with disease duration, the authors believe that there is a strong linkage disequilibrium between the two genes. FAM63A was identified as one of 39 genes exclusively expressed in CML cells, grouped with four other genes believed to function in protein ligation.
