= HNRNPR =

Protein-coding gene in humans

Identifiers
- Aliases: HNRNPR, HNRPR, hnRNP-R, heterogeneous nuclear ribonucleoprotein R
- External IDs: OMIM: 607201; MGI: 1891692; GeneCards: HNRNPR
Available structures
PDB	Human UniProt search: PDBe RCSB
PDB	List of PDB id codes 2DK2

Gene location (Human)
Chr.	Chromosome 1 (human)
Band	1p36.12	Start	23,303,771 bp
Band	1p36.12	End	23,344,336 bp

Gene location (Mouse)
Chr.	Chromosome 4 (mouse)
Band	4|4 D3	Start	136,038,253 bp
Band	4|4 D3	End	136,086,758 bp
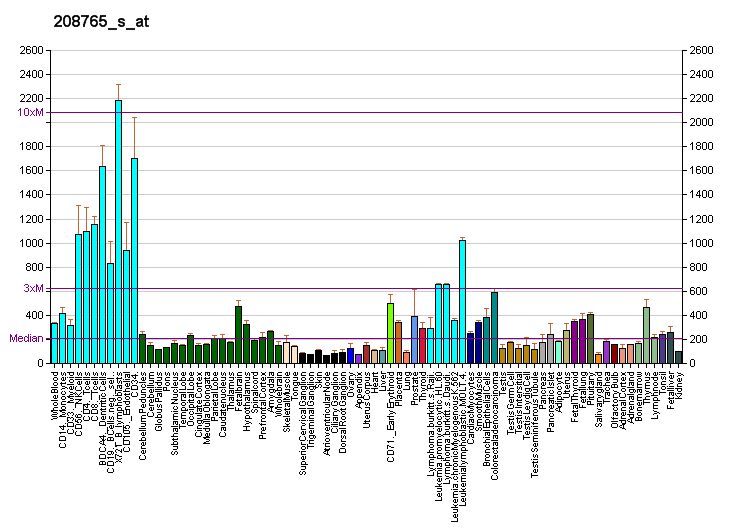

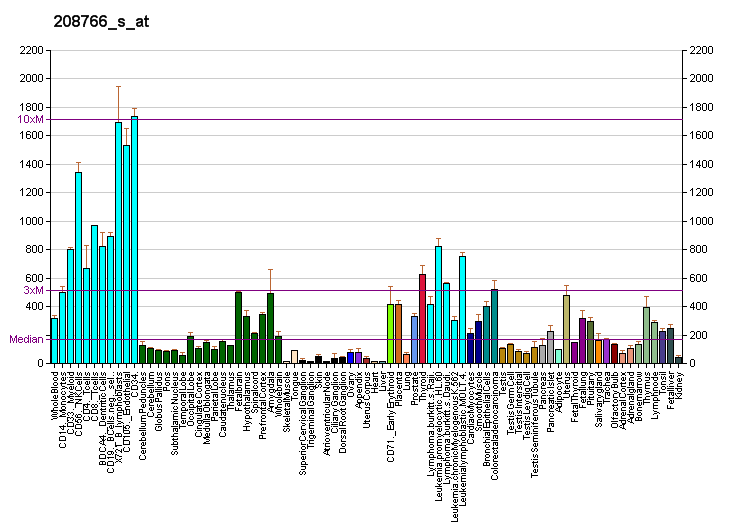
RNA expression pattern
Bgee	Human / Mouse (ortholog); Top expressed in: ventricular zone; ganglionic eminence; Achilles tendon; appendix; smooth muscle tissue; epithelium of colon; islet of Langerhans; rectum; monocyte; left ovary / Top expressed in: ventricular zone; tail of embryo; genital tubercle; hand; neural layer of retina; dentate gyrus of hippocampal formation granule cell; yolk sac; ganglionic eminence; embryo; Rostral migratory stream; More reference expression data
BioGPS	More reference expression data
Gene ontology
Molecular function	mRNA 3'-UTR binding; nucleic acid binding; protein binding; RNA binding; mRNA binding
Cellular component	nucleolus; cytoplasm; axon terminus; growth cone; nucleus; intracellular membrane-bounded organelle; dendrite; endoplasmic reticulum; catalytic step 2 spliceosome; spliceosomal complex; nucleoplasm; ribonucleoprotein complex
Biological process	circadian rhythm; positive regulation of mRNA catabolic process; mRNA destabilization; negative regulation of catalytic activity; mRNA processing; mRNA splicing, via spliceosome; RNA splicing; RNA metabolic process
Sources:Amigo / QuickGO
Orthologs
Databases	NCBI: entry; OMA: entry
Species	Human	Mouse
Entrez	10236	74326
Ensembl	ENSG00000282958; ENSG00000125944	ENSMUSG00000066037
UniProt	O43390	n/a
RefSeq (mRNA)	NM_001102397; NM_001102398; NM_001102399; NM_001297620; NM_001297621 NM_001297622; NM_005826	NM_001277121; NM_001277122; NM_001277123; NM_028871; NM_001355182
RefSeq (protein)	NP_001095867; NP_001095868; NP_001095869; NP_001284549; NP_001284550 NP_001284551; NP_005817	n/a
Location (UCSC)	Chr 1: 23.3 – 23.34 Mb	Chr 4: 136.04 – 136.09 Mb
PubMed search
- Wikidata
View/Edit Human	View/Edit Mouse

Heterogeneous nuclear ribonucleoprotein R is a protein that in humans is encoded by the HNRNPR gene.

== Function ==
This gene belongs to the subfamily of ubiquitously expressed heterogeneous nuclear ribonucleoproteins (hnRNPs). The hnRNPs are RNA-binding proteins and they complex with heterogeneous nuclear RNA (hnRNA). These proteins are associated with pre-mRNAs in the nucleus and appear to influence pre-mRNA processing and other aspects of mRNA metabolism and transport. While all of the hnRNPs are present in the nucleus, some seem to shuttle between the nucleus and the cytoplasm. The hnRNP proteins have distinct nucleic acid binding properties. The protein encoded by this gene has three repeats of RRM domains that bind to RNAs and also contains a nuclear localization motif.

HNRNPR, together with its main RNA interacting partner, 7SK, is essential for axon growth in motoneurons. Depletion of HNRNPR from primary motoneurons inhibits axonal development, but it does not lead to enhanced loss of motor neurons. It also plays an important role in axonal β-actin mRNA translocation, binding directly to the 3'-UTR of β-actin mRNA.

HNRNPR enhances c-fos transcription in vitro by forming a complex with PC4 and Mediator cofactors.

== Interactions ==
HNRNPR has been shown to interact with SMN1, PRMT1, TDP-43, and FUS/TLS.
