= TOB1 =

Protein-coding gene in the species Homo sapiens

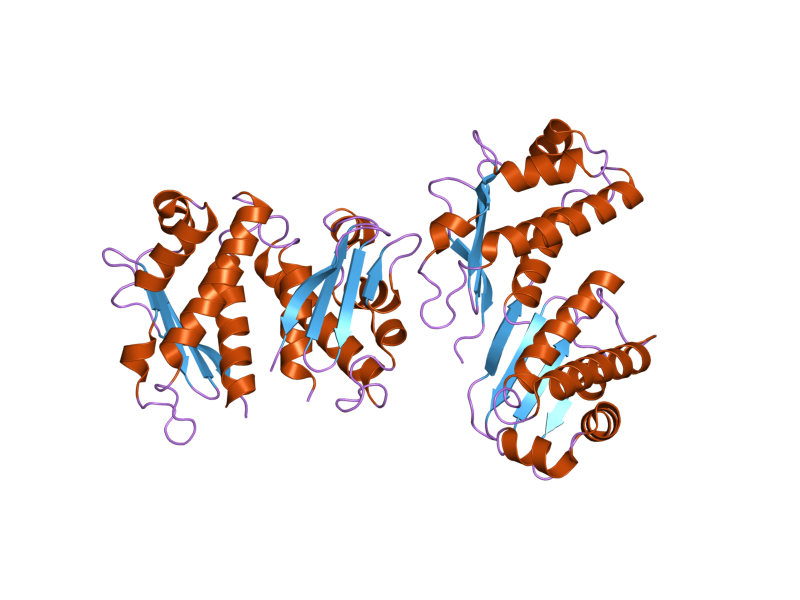
Available structures
| PDB | Ortholog search: PDBe RCSB |
| PDB | List of PDB id codes 2D5R, 2Z15, 5CI8, 5CI9 |

Identifiers
- Aliases: TOB1, APRO6, PIG49, TOB, TROB, TROB1, transducer of ERBB2, 1, APRO5
- External IDs: OMIM: 605523; MGI: 1349721; HomoloGene: 31334; GeneCards: TOB1; OMA:TOB1 - orthologs

Gene location (Human)
| Chr. | Chromosome 17 (human) |
| Band | 17q21.33 | Start | 50,862,223 bp |
| Band | 17q21.33 | End | 50,867,978 bp |

Gene location (Mouse)
| Chr. | Chromosome 11 (mouse) |
| Band | 11|11 D | Start | 94,102,280 bp |
| Band | 11|11 D | End | 94,106,321 bp |
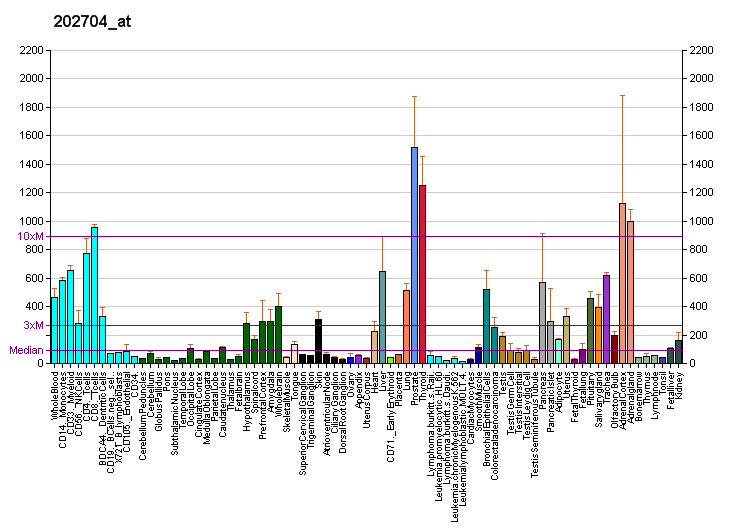
RNA expression pattern
| Bgee | Human / Mouse (ortholog); Top expressed in: mucosa of paranasal sinus; germinal epithelium; skin of thigh; Skeletal muscle tissue of biceps brachii; seminal vesicula; Epithelium of choroid plexus; trachea; vastus lateralis muscle; cardia; Skeletal muscle tissue of rectus abdominis / Top expressed in: extensor digitorum longus muscle; plantaris muscle; pineal gland; submandibular gland; parotid gland; seminal vesicula; intercostal muscle; triceps brachii muscle; digastric muscle; sternocleidomastoid muscle; More reference expression data |
| BioGPS | More reference expression data |
Gene ontology
| Molecular function | receptor tyrosine kinase binding; SMAD binding; protein binding; transcription corepressor activity |
| Cellular component | CCR4-NOT complex; cytoplasm; nucleus |
| Biological process | positive regulation of nuclear-transcribed mRNA catabolic process, deadenylation-dependent decay; negative regulation of osteoblast differentiation; negative regulation of nuclear-transcribed mRNA poly(A) tail shortening; negative regulation of nucleic acid-templated transcription; negative regulation of BMP signaling pathway; negative regulation of translation; positive regulation of nuclear-transcribed mRNA poly(A) tail shortening; BMP signaling pathway; negative regulation of cell population proliferation; positive regulation of signal transduction; regulation of SMAD protein signal transduction; regulation of gene expression |
Sources:Amigo / QuickGO
Orthologs
| Species | Human | Mouse |
| Entrez | 10140 | 22057 |
| Ensembl | ENSG00000141232 | ENSMUSG00000037573 |
| UniProt | P50616 | Q61471 |
| RefSeq (mRNA) | NM_005749; NM_001243877; NM_001243885 | NM_009427 |
| RefSeq (protein) | NP_001230806; NP_001230814; NP_005740 | NP_033453 |
| Location (UCSC) | Chr 17: 50.86 – 50.87 Mb | Chr 11: 94.1 – 94.11 Mb |
| PubMed search |
- Wikidata
| View/Edit Human | View/Edit Mouse |

Protein Tob1 is a protein that in humans is encoded by the TOB1 gene.

== Function ==
This gene encodes a member of the tob/btg1 family of anti-proliferative proteins that have the potential to regulate cell growth. When exogenously expressed, this protein suppresses cell growth in tissue culture. The protein undergoes phosphorylation by a serine/threonine kinase, 90 kDa ribosomal S6 kinase. Interactions of this protein with the v-erb-b2 erythroblastic leukemia viral oncogene homolog 2 gene product p185 interferes with growth suppression. This protein inhibits T cell proliferation and transcription of cytokines and cyclins. The protein interacts with both mothers against decapentaplegic Drosophila homolog 2 and 4 to enhance their DNA binding activity. This interaction inhibits interleukin 2 transcription in T cells.

== Interactions ==
TOB1 has been shown to interact with:

- CNOT7,
- MAPK1
- MARCKS,
- Mitogen-activated protein kinase 9, and
- RPS6KA1.
