= Protein BTG4 =

Protein-coding gene in the species Homo sapiens

BTG4

Identifiers
- Aliases: BTG4, PC3B, BTG family member 4, BTG anti-proliferation factor 4, APRO3, OOMD8
- External IDs: OMIM: 605673; MGI: 1860140; HomoloGene: 9734; GeneCards: BTG4; OMA:BTG4 - orthologs

Gene location (Human)
Chr.	Chromosome 11 (human)
Band	11q23.1	Start	111,467,526 bp
Band	11q23.1	End	111,514,367 bp

Gene location (Mouse)
Chr.	Chromosome 9 (mouse)
Band	9|9 A5.3	Start	50,972,201 bp
Band	9|9 A5.3	End	51,031,175 bp
RNA expression pattern
Bgee	Human / Mouse (ortholog); Top expressed in: oocyte; secondary oocyte; sperm; gonad; left testis; right testis; testicle; olfactory zone of nasal mucosa; bronchial epithelial cell; right uterine tube / Top expressed in: primary oocyte; zygote; secondary oocyte; spermatid; spermatocyte; seminiferous tubule; morula; morula; blastocyst; ovary; More reference expression data
BioGPS	n/a
Orthologs
Species	Human	Mouse
Entrez	54766	56057
Ensembl	ENSG00000137707	ENSMUSG00000032056
UniProt	Q9NY30	O70552
RefSeq (mRNA)	NM_017589; NM_001367974; NM_001367975; NM_001367976	NM_019493; NM_001401092
RefSeq (protein)	NP_060059; NP_001354903; NP_001354904; NP_001354905	NP_062366; NP_001388021
Location (UCSC)	Chr 11: 111.47 – 111.51 Mb	Chr 9: 50.97 – 51.03 Mb
PubMed search
- Wikidata
View/Edit Human	View/Edit Mouse

Protein BTG4 also known as BTG family member 4 is a protein that in humans is encoded by the BTG4 gene (B-cell translocation gene 4). BTG4 has anti-proliferative properties and can induce G_{1} cell cycle arrest.
