= GSPT2 =

Protein-coding gene in humans

Identifiers
- Aliases: GSPT2, ERF3B, GST2, G1 to S phase transition 2
- External IDs: OMIM: 300418; MGI: 1316727; GeneCards: GSPT2
Available structures
PDB	Ortholog search: PDBe RCSB
PDB	List of PDB id codes 3KUJ

Gene location (Human)
Chr.	X chromosome (human)
Band	Xp11.22	Start	51,743,442 bp
Band	Xp11.22	End	51,746,232 bp

Gene location (Mouse)
Chr.	X chromosome (mouse)
Band	X|X C3	Start	93,679,675 bp
Band	X|X C3	End	93,686,850 bp
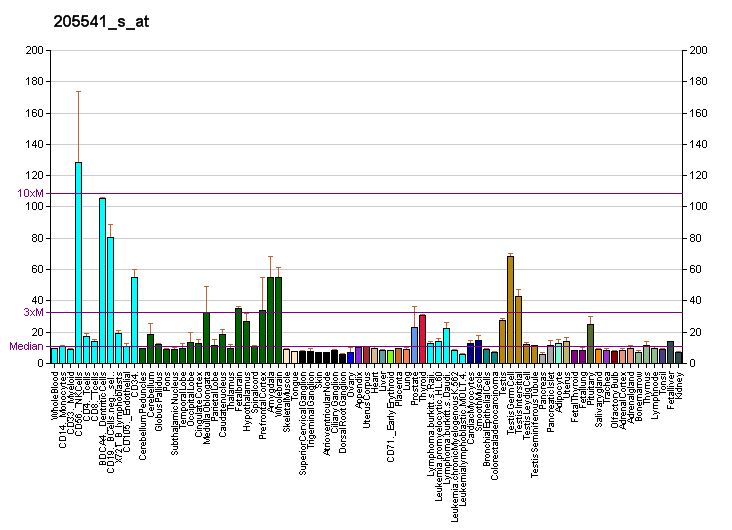
RNA expression pattern
Bgee	Human / Mouse (ortholog); Top expressed in: sperm; germinal epithelium; Epithelium of choroid plexus; ventricular zone; gonad; ganglionic eminence; Brodmann area 23; middle temporal gyrus; retinal pigment epithelium; hair follicle / Top expressed in: seminal vesicula; primary oocyte; zygote; secondary oocyte; dorsomedial hypothalamic nucleus; suprachiasmatic nucleus; efferent ductule; ventromedial nucleus; subiculum; lateral septal nucleus; More reference expression data
BioGPS	More reference expression data
Gene ontology
Molecular function	nucleotide binding; GTP binding; translation release factor activity; protein binding; GTPase activity; RNA binding
Cellular component	cytoplasm; cytosol; translation release factor complex
Biological process	translational termination; cell cycle; nuclear-transcribed mRNA catabolic process, nonsense-mediated decay; cytoplasmic translational termination; protein biosynthesis
Sources:Amigo / QuickGO
Orthologs
Databases	NCBI: entry; OMA: entry
Species	Human	Mouse
Entrez	23708	14853
Ensembl	ENSG00000189369	ENSMUSG00000071723
UniProt	Q8IYD1	Q149F3
RefSeq (mRNA)	NM_018094	NM_008179
RefSeq (protein)	NP_060564	NP_032205
Location (UCSC)	Chr X: 51.74 – 51.75 Mb	Chr X: 93.68 – 93.69 Mb
PubMed search
- Wikidata
View/Edit Human	View/Edit Mouse

Eukaryotic peptide chain release factor GTP-binding subunit ERF3B is an enzyme that in humans is encoded by the GSPT2 gene.

GSPT2 is closely related to GSPT1 (MIM 139259), a GTP-binding protein that plays an essential role at the G1- to S-phase transition of the cell cycle in yeast and human cells. GSPT1 is a positive regulator of translational accuracy and, in a binary complex with eRF1 (MIM 600285), functions as a polypeptide chain release factor.[supplied by OMIM]

== Interactions ==
GSPT2 has been shown to interact with PABPC1.
