= TOB2 =

Protein-coding gene in the species Homo sapiens

Identifiers
- Aliases: TOB2, TOB4, TOBL, TROB2, transducer of ERBB2, 2, APRO5
- External IDs: OMIM: 607396; MGI: 1888525; HomoloGene: 9447; GeneCards: TOB2; OMA:TOB2 - orthologs

Gene location (Human)
Chr.	Chromosome 22 (human)
Band	22q13.2	Start	41,433,494 bp
Band	22q13.2	End	41,446,801 bp

Gene location (Mouse)
Chr.	Chromosome 15 (mouse)
Band	15|15 E1	Start	81,732,473 bp
Band	15|15 E1	End	81,742,997 bp
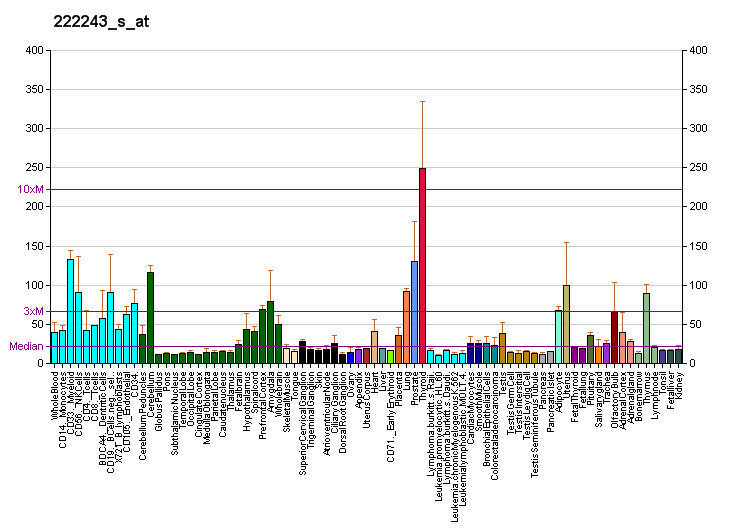

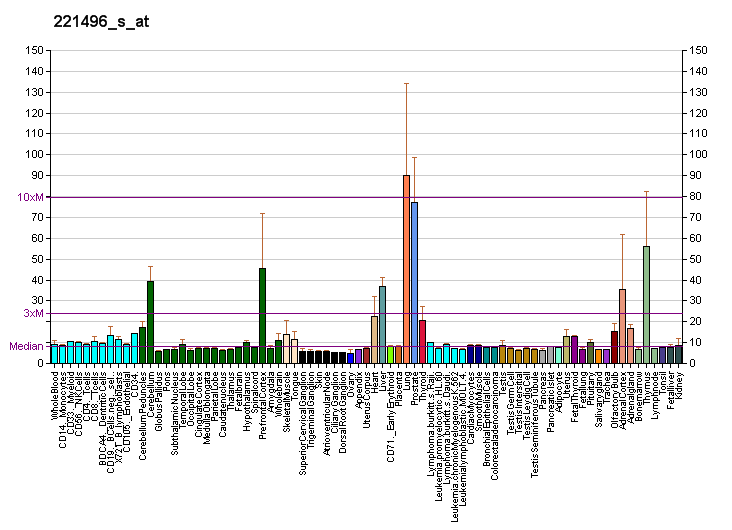
RNA expression pattern
Bgee	Human / Mouse (ortholog); Top expressed in: optic nerve; paraflocculus of cerebellum; gastric mucosa; mucosa of paranasal sinus; muscle of thigh; popliteal artery; tibial arteries; gastrocnemius muscle; right hemisphere of cerebellum; Skeletal muscle tissue of rectus abdominis / Top expressed in: ascending aorta; aortic valve; retinal pigment epithelium; ciliary body; neural layer of retina; brown adipose tissue; epithelium of lens; medial head of gastrocnemius muscle; primary oocyte; masseter muscle; More reference expression data
BioGPS	More reference expression data
Gene ontology
Molecular function	protein binding; vitamin D receptor binding; transcription corepressor activity
Cellular component	nucleus; cytoplasm; cytosol
Biological process	positive regulation of ossification; female gamete generation; negative regulation of osteoclast differentiation; regulation of gene expression; negative regulation of cell population proliferation; signaling; negative regulation of nucleic acid-templated transcription
Sources:Amigo / QuickGO
Orthologs
Species	Human	Mouse
Entrez	10766	57259
Ensembl	ENSG00000183864	ENSMUSG00000048546
UniProt	Q14106	Q9JM55
RefSeq (mRNA)	NM_016272	NM_020507
RefSeq (protein)	NP_057356	NP_065253
Location (UCSC)	Chr 22: 41.43 – 41.45 Mb	Chr 15: 81.73 – 81.74 Mb
PubMed search
- Wikidata
View/Edit Human	View/Edit Mouse

Protein Tob2 (transducer of ERBB2, 2) is a protein that in humans is encoded by the TOB2 gene.

TOB2 belongs to the TOB (see TOB1; MIM 605523)/BTG1 (MIM 109580) family of antiproliferative proteins, which are involved in the regulation of cell cycle progression.[supplied by OMIM]

== Interactions ==
TOB2 has been shown to interact with CNOT7.
