= CCL28 =

Mammalian protein found in humans

Identifiers
- Aliases: CCL28, CCK1, MEC, SCYA28, C-C motif chemokine ligand 28
- External IDs: OMIM: 605240; MGI: 1861731; GeneCards: CCL28

Gene location (Human)
Chr.	Chromosome 5 (human)
Band	5p12	Start	43,376,645 bp
Band	5p12	End	43,412,391 bp

Gene location (Mouse)
Chr.	Chromosome 13 (mouse)
Band	13|13 D2.3	Start	120,085,355 bp
Band	13|13 D2.3	End	120,115,895 bp
RNA expression pattern
Bgee	Human / Mouse (ortholog); Top expressed in: parotid gland; pancreatic ductal cell; minor salivary glands; rectum; olfactory zone of nasal mucosa; mucosa of colon; epithelium of lactiferous gland; mucosa of sigmoid colon; lactiferous duct; mucosa of transverse colon / Top expressed in: lacrimal gland; salivary gland; Paneth cell; submandibular gland; parotid gland; left colon; duodenum; proximal tubule; right kidney; ileum; More reference expression data
BioGPS	n/a
Gene ontology
Molecular function	chemokine activity; cytokine activity; protein binding
Cellular component	extracellular region; extracellular exosome; extracellular space; secretory granule
Biological process	cell chemotaxis; chemotaxis; positive regulation of cytosolic calcium ion concentration; negative regulation of leukocyte tethering or rolling; immune response; positive regulation of cell-matrix adhesion; response to nutrient; antimicrobial humoral immune response mediated by antimicrobial peptide; regulation of signaling receptor activity; G protein-coupled receptor signaling pathway
Sources:Amigo / QuickGO
Orthologs
Databases	NCBI: entry; OMA: entry
Species	Human	Mouse
Entrez	56477	56838
Ensembl	ENSG00000151882	ENSMUSG00000074715
UniProt	Q9NRJ3	Q9JIL2
RefSeq (mRNA)	NM_001301873; NM_001301874; NM_001301875; NM_019846; NM_148672	NM_020279
RefSeq (protein)	NP_001288802; NP_001288803; NP_001288804; NP_683513	NP_064675
Location (UCSC)	Chr 5: 43.38 – 43.41 Mb	Chr 13: 120.09 – 120.12 Mb
PubMed search
- Wikidata
View/Edit Human	View/Edit Mouse

Chemokine (C-C motif) ligand 28 (CCL28), also known as mucosae-associated epithelial chemokine (MEC), CCK1 and SCYA28, is a chemokine. CCL28 regulates the chemotaxis of cells that express the chemokine receptors CCR3 and CCR10. CCL28 is expressed by columnar epithelial cells in the gut, lung, breast and the salivary glands and drives the mucosal homing of T and B lymphocytes that express CCR10, and the migration of eosinophils expressing CCR3. This chemokine is constitutively expressed in the colon, but its levels can be increased by pro-inflammatory cytokines and certain bacterial products implying a role in effector cell recruitment to sites of epithelial injury. CCL28 has also been implicated in the migration of IgA-expressing cells to the mammary gland, salivary gland, intestine and other mucosal tissues. It has also been shown as a potential antimicrobial agent effective against certain pathogens, such as Gram negative and Gram positive bacteria and the fungus Candida albicans.

Human CCL28 is encoded by an RNA transcript of 373 nucleotides and a gene with four exons. The gene codes for a 127-amino acid CCL28 protein with a 22-amino acid N-terminal signal peptide. It shares 76% nucleic acid identity and 83% amino acid similarity to the equivalent molecule in mouse. Sequence analysis has revealed CCL28 to be most similar to another CC chemokine called CCL27.

== Gene neighbourhood ==
The gene C5orf34 is found downstream of CCL28 and is a predicted to be in the Polo-like Kinase family. C5orf34 extends from base pair 43,486,701 to base pair 43,515,445.
