= PAIP1 =

Protein-coding gene in the species Homo sapiens

Identifiers
- Aliases: PAIP1, poly(A) binding protein interacting protein 1
- External IDs: OMIM: 605184; MGI: 2384993; GeneCards: PAIP1
Available structures
| PDB | Ortholog search: PDBe RCSB |
| PDB | List of PDB id codes 1JH4, 3NTW, 3RK6 |

Gene location (Human)
| Chr. | Chromosome 5 (human) |
| Band | 5p12 | Start | 43,526,267 bp |
| Band | 5p12 | End | 43,557,758 bp |

Gene location (Mouse)
| Chr. | Chromosome 13 (mouse) |
| Band | 13|13 D2.3 | Start | 119,565,137 bp |
| Band | 13|13 D2.3 | End | 119,594,754 bp |
RNA expression pattern
| Bgee | Human / Mouse (ortholog); Top expressed in: ventricular zone; ganglionic eminence; muscle of thigh; gastrocnemius muscle; islet of Langerhans; smooth muscle tissue; left ventricle; endometrium; skeletal muscle tissue; C1 segment / Top expressed in: zygote; secondary oocyte; spermatocyte; primary oocyte; ventricular zone; retinal pigment epithelium; genital tubercle; muscle of thigh; ciliary body; pineal gland; More reference expression data |
| BioGPS | n/a |
Gene ontology
| Molecular function | translation activator activity; protein binding; RNA binding |
| Cellular component | cytoplasm; cytosol |
| Biological process | translational initiation; mRNA stabilization; regulation of translation; positive regulation of translation; regulation of translational initiation |
Sources:Amigo / QuickGO
Orthologs
| Databases | NCBI: entry; OMA: entry |
| Species | Human | Mouse |
| Entrez | 10605 | 218693 |
| Ensembl | ENSG00000172239 | ENSMUSG00000025451 |
| UniProt | Q9H074 | Q8VE62 |
| RefSeq (mRNA) | NM_006451; NM_182789; NM_183323 | NM_001079849; NM_145457 |
| RefSeq (protein) | NP_006442; NP_877590; NP_899152 | NP_001073318; NP_663432 |
| Location (UCSC) | Chr 5: 43.53 – 43.56 Mb | Chr 13: 119.57 – 119.59 Mb |
| PubMed search |
- Wikidata
| View/Edit Human | View/Edit Mouse |

Polyadenylate-binding protein-interacting protein 1 is a protein that in humans is encoded by the PAIP1 gene.

== Function ==
The protein encoded by this gene interacts with poly(A)-binding protein and with the cap-binding complex eIF4A. It is involved in translational initiation and protein biosynthesis. Overexpression of this gene in COS7 cells stimulates translation. Alternative splicing occurs at this locus and three transcript variants encoding three distinct isoforms have been identified.

== Interactions ==
PAIP1 has been shown to interact with PABPC1.
