= BTG anti-proliferation factor 1 =

Protein-coding gene in humans

BTG1

Identifiers
- Aliases: BTG1, BTG anti-proliferation factor 1, APRO2
- External IDs: OMIM: 109580; MGI: 88215; GeneCards: BTG1

Gene location (Human)
Chr.	Chromosome 12 (human)
Band	12q21.33	Start	92,140,278 bp
Band	12q21.33	End	92,145,846 bp

Gene location (Mouse)
Chr.	Chromosome 10 (mouse)
Band	10|10 C3	Start	96,452,868 bp
Band	10|10 C3	End	96,458,671 bp
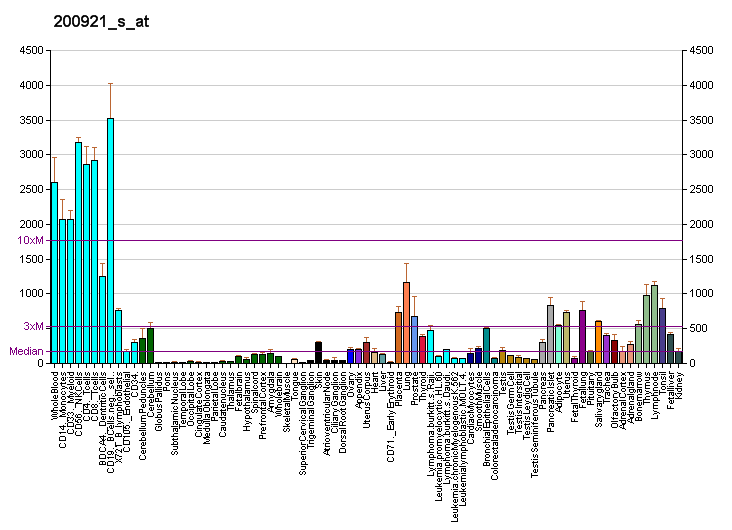

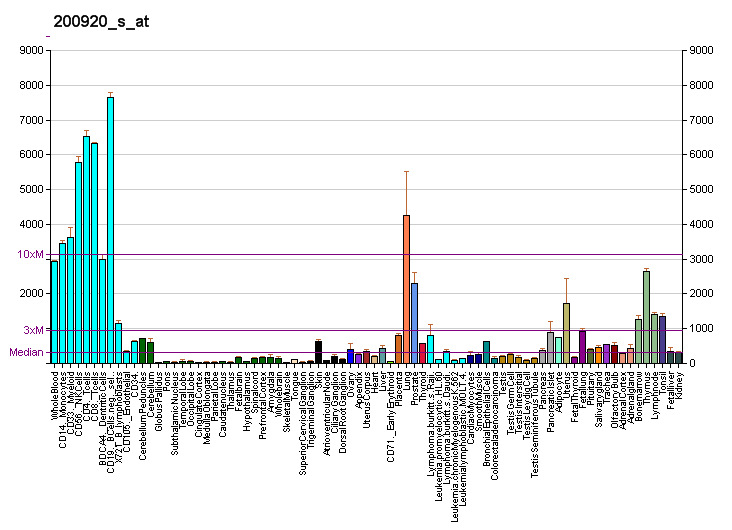
RNA expression pattern
Bgee	Human / Mouse (ortholog); Top expressed in: lower lobe of lung; nipple; pericardium; tail of epididymis; lymph node; epithelium of nasopharynx; human penis; thymus; skin of leg; superficial temporal artery / Top expressed in: granulocyte; Rostral migratory stream; ventricular zone; lip; esophagus; spermatid; morula; right kidney; thymus; spermatocyte; More reference expression data
BioGPS	More reference expression data
Gene ontology
Molecular function	enzyme binding; kinase binding; protein binding; transcription coregulator activity
Cellular component	cytoplasm; nucleus; nucleoplasm
Biological process	positive regulation of fibroblast apoptotic process; regulation of transcription, DNA-templated; positive regulation of endothelial cell differentiation; cell migration; positive regulation of myoblast differentiation; negative regulation of cell growth; positive regulation of angiogenesis; negative regulation of cell population proliferation; protein methylation; response to oxidative stress; spermatogenesis; response to peptide hormone; negative regulation of mitotic cell cycle
Sources:Amigo / QuickGO
Orthologs
Databases	NCBI: entry; OMA: entry
Species	Human	Mouse
Entrez	694	12226
Ensembl	ENSG00000133639	ENSMUSG00000036478
UniProt	P62324; Q6IBC8	P62325
RefSeq (mRNA)	NM_001731	NM_007569
RefSeq (protein)	NP_001722; NP_001722.1	NP_031595
Location (UCSC)	Chr 12: 92.14 – 92.15 Mb	Chr 10: 96.45 – 96.46 Mb
PubMed search
- Wikidata
View/Edit Human	View/Edit Mouse

BTG anti-proliferation factor 1 is a protein that in humans is encoded by the BTG1 gene.

== Function ==
The BTG1 gene locus has been shown to be involved in a t(8;12)(q24;q22) chromosomal translocation in a case of B-cell chronic lymphocytic leukemia. It is a member of a family of antiproliferative genes. BTG1 expression is maximal in the G0/G1 phases of the cell cycle and downregulated when cells progressed through G1. It negatively regulates cell proliferation.

== Interactions ==
BTG1 has been shown to interact with:

- CNOT7,
- CNOT8,
- HOXB9, and
- PRMT1.

== Clinical relevance ==
Recurrent mutations in this gene have been associated to cases of diffuse large B-cell lymphoma.

== Maintenance of adult neural stem cells ==
Recent data, obtained in a new model of mouse lacking the BTG1 gene, indicate that BTG1 is essential for the proliferation and expansion of stem cells in the adult neurogenic niches, i.e. the dentate gyrus and sub ventricular zone (see for review). In particular, BTG1 keeps adult neural stem cells in quiescence, preserving the neural stem cells pool from depletion. In the absence of BTG1, the stem and progenitor cells initially hyper proliferate and then in the longer period lose the ability to proliferate and expand. Other recent data indicate that physical exercise can fully reconstitute the proliferative defect of stem cells that follows the ablation of the BTG1 gene, suggesting that the pool of neural stem cells maintains a hidden form of plasticity which is tightly controlled by BTG1; hence, BTG1 might prevent the depletion of stem cells in the presence of strong neurogenic stimuli or of neural degenerative stimuli.

Btg1 plays a role also in the expansion of cerebellar granule precursor cells. In fact the deletion of Btg1 leads in mouse to uncontrolled proliferation of the cerebellar precursor cells during the early postnatal period. Consequently, in the adult, the cerebellum lacking Btg1 is significantly larger and the motor coordination is heavily impaired.

The closest homolog of BTG1 is BTG2, which also controls the proliferation and differentiation of adult neural stem cells; the role of BTG2, however, appears to differ from that of BTG1 being probably more relevant in controlling the terminal differentiation of neural stem and progenitor cells in the adult neurogenic niches.
