= Protein BTG3 =

Protein-coding gene in the species Homo sapiens

BTG3

Identifiers
- Aliases: BTG3, ANA, TOB5, TOB55, TOFA, BTG family member 3, BTG anti-proliferation factor 3, ANA/APRO4
- External IDs: OMIM: 605674; MGI: 109532; HomoloGene: 4953; GeneCards: BTG3; OMA:BTG3 - orthologs

Gene location (Human)
Chr.	Chromosome 21 (human)
Band	21q21.1	Start	17,593,653 bp
Band	21q21.1	End	17,612,945 bp

Gene location (Mouse)
Chr.	Chromosome 16 (mouse)
Band	16|16 C3.1	Start	78,129,525 bp
Band	16|16 C3.1	End	78,174,080 bp
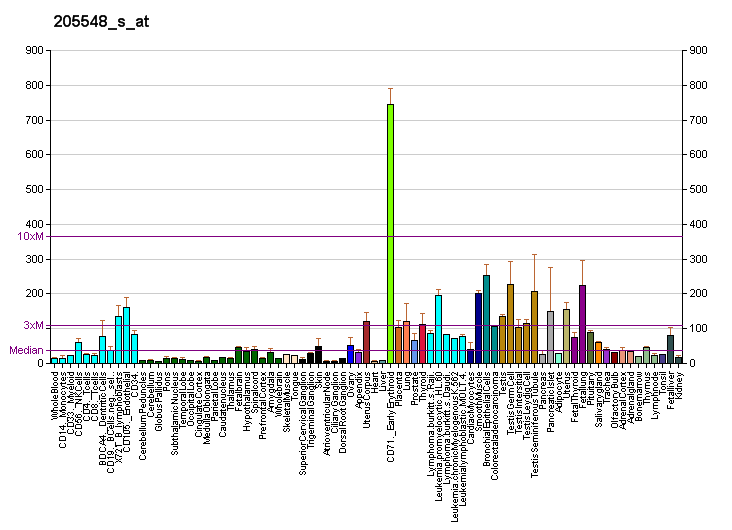

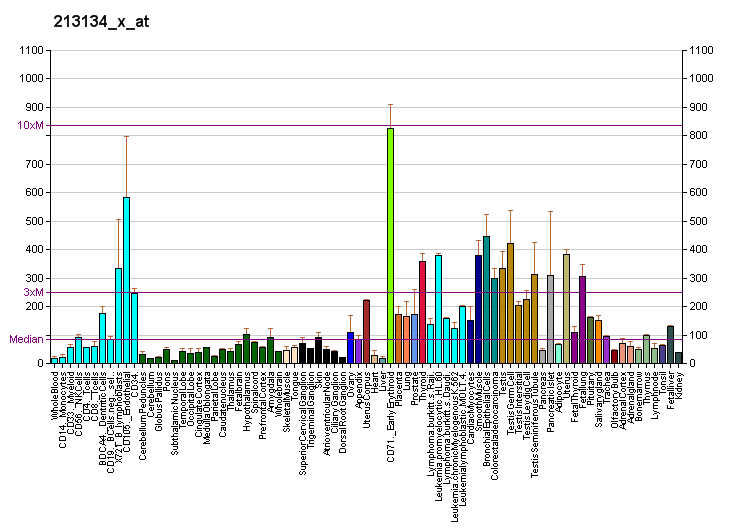
RNA expression pattern
Bgee	Human / Mouse (ortholog); Top expressed in: ventricular zone; cartilage tissue; corpus epididymis; ganglionic eminence; parotid gland; gingival epithelium; islet of Langerhans; right uterine tube; beta cell; lower lobe of lung / Top expressed in: pancreas; epiblast; lung; islet of Langerhans; embryo; ventricular zone; embryo; placenta; lip; ovary; More reference expression data
BioGPS	More reference expression data
Gene ontology
Molecular function	protein binding
Cellular component	cytoplasm; nucleus
Biological process	negative regulation of cell population proliferation; negative regulation of mitotic cell cycle
Sources:Amigo / QuickGO
Orthologs
Species	Human	Mouse
Entrez	10950	12228
Ensembl	ENSG00000281484; ENSG00000154640	ENSMUSG00000022863
UniProt	Q14201; Q6IAU3	P50615
RefSeq (mRNA)	NM_001130914; NM_006806	NM_001297747; NM_009770
RefSeq (protein)	NP_001124386; NP_006797; NP_001124386.1; NP_006797.3	NP_001284676; NP_033900
Location (UCSC)	Chr 21: 17.59 – 17.61 Mb	Chr 16: 78.13 – 78.17 Mb
PubMed search
- Wikidata
View/Edit Human	View/Edit Mouse

Protein BTG3 is a protein that in humans is encoded by the BTG3 gene.

The protein encoded by this gene is a member of the BTG/Tob family. This family has structurally related proteins that appear to have antiproliferative properties. This encoded protein might play a role in neurogenesis in the central nervous system.
