= Myc-tag =

Polypeptide protein tag

A myc tag is a polypeptide protein tag derived from the c-myc gene product that can be added to a protein using recombinant DNA technology. It can be used for affinity chromatography, then used to separate recombinant, overexpressed protein from wild type protein expressed by the host organism. It can also be used in the isolation of protein complexes with multiple subunits, and to identify the interaction partners of tagged proteins, including ligand-receptor pairs.

A myc tag can be used in many different assays that require recognition by an antibody and was originally identified in 1985. If there is no antibody against the studied protein, adding a myc-tag allows one to follow the protein with an antibody against the Myc epitope. Examples are cellular localization studies by immunofluorescence or detection by Western blotting.

The peptide sequence of the myc-tag is (in 1- and 3-letter codes, respectively): EQKLISEEDL and Glu-Gln-Lys-Leu-Ile-Ser-Glu-Glu-Asp-Leu. The tag is approximately 1202 daltons in atomic mass and has 10 amino acids.

It can be fused to the C-terminus and the N-terminus of a protein. It is advisable not to fuse the myc-tag directly behind the signal peptide of a secretory protein, since it can interfere with translocation into the secretory pathway.

A monoclonal antibody against the myc epitope, named 9E10, is available from the non-commercial Developmental Studies Hybridoma Bank.

== See also ==
- Protein tag
  - Polyhistidine-tag
  - SpyTag
  - Flag-tag
