= Protein tag =

Artificial peptide attached to protein for marking purpose

Protein tags are peptide sequences genetically grafted onto a recombinant protein. Tags are attached to proteins for various purposes. They can be added to either end of the target protein, so they are either C-terminus or N-terminus specific or are both C-terminus and N-terminus specific. Some tags are also inserted at sites within the protein of interest; they are known as internal tags.

Affinity tags are appended to proteins so that they can be purified from their crude biological source using an affinity technique. Affinity tags include chitin binding protein (CBP), maltose binding protein (MBP), Strep-tag and glutathione-S-transferase (GST). The poly(His) tag is a widely used protein tag, which binds to matrices bearing immobilized metal ions.

Solubilization tags are used, especially for recombinant proteins expressed in species such as E. coli, to assist in the proper folding in proteins and keep them from aggregating in inclusion bodies. These tags include thioredoxin (TRX) and poly(NANP). Some affinity tags have a dual role as a solubilization agent, such as MBP and GST.

Chromatography tags are used to alter chromatographic properties of the protein to afford different resolution across a particular separation technique. Often, these consist of polyanionic amino acids, such as FLAG-tag or polyglutamate tag.

Epitope tags are short peptide sequences which are chosen because high-affinity antibodies can be reliably produced in many different species. These are usually derived from viral genes, which explain their high immunoreactivity. Epitope tags include ALFA-tag, V5-tag, Myc-tag, HA-tag, Spot-tag, T7-tag and NE-tag. These tags are particularly useful for western blotting, immunofluorescence and immunoprecipitation experiments, although they also find use in antibody purification. First described in 1984 by Munro and Pelham to detect and track proteins in COS cells, epitope tags were quickly adapted to track proteins in Xenopus oocytes; to detect and immunoaffinity purify proteins from yeast and E. coli; and to detect, pull down, and clone interaction partners of ligands in mammalian cells. At first, these tags were referred to as "peptide tag", "epitope insertion", "marker sequence", and "epitope addition", until "epitope tag" was coined and popularized.

Fluorescence tags are used to give visual readout on a protein. Green fluorescent protein (GFP) and its variants are the most commonly used fluorescence tags. More advanced applications of GFP include using it as a folding reporter (fluorescent if folded, colorless if not).

Protein tags may allow specific enzymatic modification (such as biotinylation by biotin ligase) or chemical modification (such as coupling to other proteins through SpyCatcher or reaction with FlAsH-EDT2 for fluorescence imaging). Often tags are combined, in order to connect proteins to multiple other components. However, with the addition of each tag comes the risk that the native function of the protein may be compromised by interactions with the tag. Therefore, after purification, tags are sometimes removed by specific proteolysis (e.g. by TEV protease, Thrombin, Factor Xa or Enteropeptidase) or intein splicing.

== List of protein tags ==
(See Proteinogenic amino acid#Chemical properties for the A-Z amino-acid codes)

=== Peptide tags ===
Short tags on proteins are more commonly called "epitope tags." The tags on this list would fall under that category. "Epitope tagging" is the process of adding a short peptide to a protein such that it can be detected using an antibody specific to that peptide (epitope).

- ALFA-tag, a de novo designed helical peptide tag (SRLEEELRRRLTE) for biochemical and microscopy applications. The tag is recognized by a repertoire of single-domain antibodies
- AviTag, a peptide allowing biotinylation by the enzyme BirA and so the protein can be isolated by streptavidin (GLNDIFEAQKIEWHE)
- EPEA-tag, commercially called CaptureSelect C-tag, a 4 AA peptide that is recognized by a VHH or single-domain camelid antibody which was discovered through phage display (EPEA)
- Calmodulin-tag, a peptide bound by the protein calmodulin (KRRWKKNFIAVSAANRFKKISSSGAL)
- iCapTag™ (intein Capture Tag), a self-removing peptide-based tag (MIKIATRKYLGKQNVYGIGVERDHNFALKNGFIAHN). The iCapTag™ is controlled by pH change. Typically the pH change occurs from pH 8.5 to pH 6.2 and causes release of tagless target-protein to eluent. If needed the pH shift and buffers can be optimized for protein-specific purification method (e.g., for membrane proteins detergent could be added to the buffers to increase solubility of the protein). In contrast to other protein purification methods, this method is not relaying on proteases to cleave off a tag from tag-protein complex. Instead, during elution phase since buffer pH is changed from 8.5 to pH 6.2 that triggers cleavage reaction resulting in a release of tagless target protein while highly engineered tag stays attached to the column. The expected purity of tagless target proteins or peptides is between 95-99%. The iCapTag™ contains patented component derived from Nostoc punctiforme (Npu) intein. This tag is used for protein purification of peptides, fragments of mAbs, recombinant proteins and its fragments. It can be used in research labs and it is intended for large-scale purification during downstream manufacturing process as well. The iCapTag™-target protein complex can be expressed in a wide range of expression hosts (e.g. CHO and E.coli cells)
- polyglutamate tag, a peptide binding efficiently to anion-exchange resin such as Mono-Q (EEEEEE)
- polyarginine tag, a peptide binding efficiently to cation-exchange resin (from 5 to 9 consecutive R)
- E-tag, a peptide recognized by an antibody (GAPVPYPDPLEPR)
- FLAG-tag, a peptide recognized by an antibody (DYKDDDDK)
- HA-tag, a peptide from hemagglutinin recognized by an antibody (YPYDVPDYA)
- His-tag, 5-10 histidines bound by a nickel or cobalt chelate (HHHHHH)
  - Gly-His-tags are N-terminal His-Tag variants (e.g. GHHHH, or GHHHHHH, or GSSHHHHHH) that still bind to immobilised metal cations but can also be activated via azidogluconoylation to enable click-chemistry applications
- Myc-tag, a peptide derived from c-myc recognized by an antibody (EQKLISEEDL)
- NE-tag, an 18-amino-acid synthetic peptide (TKENPRSNQEESYDDNES) recognized by a monoclonal IgG1 antibody, which is useful in a wide spectrum of applications including Western blotting, ELISA, flow cytometry, immunocytochemistry, immunoprecipitation, and affinity purification of recombinant proteins
- Rho1D4-tag, refers to the last 9 amino acids of the intracellular C-terminus of bovine rhodopsin (TETSQVAPA). It is a very specific tag that can be used for purification of membrane proteins.
- S-tag, a peptide derived from Ribonuclease A (KETAAAKFERQHMDS)
- SBP-tag, a peptide which binds to streptavidin (MDEKTTGWRGGHVVEGLAGELEQLRARLEHHPQGQREP)
- Softag 1, for mammalian expression (SLAELLNAGLGGS)
- Softag 3, for prokaryotic expression (TQDPSRVG)
- Spot-tag, a peptide recognized by a nanobody (PDRVRAVSHWSS) for immunoprecipitation, affinity purification, immunofluorescence and super resolution microscopy
- Strep-tag, a peptide which binds to streptavidin or the modified streptavidin called streptactin (Strep-tag II: WSHPQFEK)
- T7-tag, an epitope tag derived from the T7 major capsid protein of the T7 gene (MASMTGGQQMG). Used in different immunoassays as well as affinity purification Mainly used
- TC tag, a tetracysteine tag that is recognized by FlAsH and ReAsH biarsenical compounds (CCPGCC)
- Ty tag (EVHTNQDPLD)
- V5 tag, a peptide recognized by an antibody (GKPIPNPLLGLDST)
- VSV-tag, a peptide recognized by an antibody (YTDIEMNRLGK)
- Xpress tag (DLYDDDDK), a peptide recognized by an antibody

=== Covalent peptide tags ===
- Isopeptag, a peptide which binds covalently to pilin-C protein (TDKDMTITFTNKKDAE)
- SpyTag, a peptide which binds covalently to SpyCatcher protein (AHIVMVDAYKPTK)
- SnoopTag, a peptide which binds covalently to SnoopCatcher protein (KLGDIEFIKVNK). A second generation, SnoopTagJr, was also developed to bind to either SnoopCatcher or DogTag (mediated by SnoopLigase) (KLGSIEFIKVNK)
- DogTag, a peptide which covalently binds to DogCatcher (DIPATYEFTDGKHYITNEPIPPK) and can react as an internal tag in loops of proteins. DogTag can also covalently bind to SnoopTagJr, mediated by SnoopLigase.
- SdyTag, a peptide which binds covalently to SdyCatcher protein (DPIVMIDNDKPIT). SdyTag/SdyCatcher has a kinetic-dependent cross-reactivity with SpyTag/SpyCatcher.

=== Protein tags ===
- BCCP (Biotin Carboxyl Carrier Protein), a protein domain biotinylated by BirA enabling recognition by streptavidin
- BromoTag, a "bump-and-hole" mutated version of the second bromodomain of Brd4, Brd4-BD2 L387A, that can be highly selectively bound by tag-specific PROTAC degrader AGB1 to form a ternary complex between the "BromoTagged" protein and the E3 ligase VHL, leading to ubiquitination of the tagged protein and its subsequent rapid and effective proteasomal degradation in cells.
- FAST (Fluorescence-Activating and absorption-Shifting Tag), a mutated photoactive yellow protein (PYP) that reversibly binds cognate fluorogenic ligands
- CL7-tag, an engineered variant of Colicin E7 that has a strong binding affinity and specificity for immobilized Immunity Protein 7 (Im7).
- Glutathione-S-transferase-tag, a protein which binds to immobilized glutathione
- Green fluorescent protein-tag, a protein which is spontaneously fluorescent and can be bound by nanobodies
- HaloTag, a mutated bacterial haloalkane dehalogenase that covalently attaches to haloalkane substrates
- SNAP-tag, a mutated eukaryotic DNA methyltransferase that covalently attaches to benzylguanine derivatives
- CLIP-tag, a mutated eukaryotic DNA methyltransferase that covalently attaches to benzylcytosine derivatives
- HUH-tag, a sequence-specific single-stranded DNA binding protein that covalently binds to its target sequence
- Maltose binding protein-tag, a protein which binds to amylose agarose
- Nus-tag
- Thioredoxin-tag
- Fc-tag, derived from immunoglobulin Fc domain, allow dimerization and solubilization. Can be used for purification on Protein-A Sepharose
- Designed Intrinsically Disordered tags containing disorder promoting amino acids (P,E,S,T,A,Q,G,..)
- Carbohydrate Recognition Domain or CRDSAT-tag, a protein which binds to lactose agarose or Sepharose

=== Others ===
HiBiT-tag was developed by Scientists at Promega. It is an 11-amino-acid peptide tag, and it can be fused to the N- or C-terminus or internal locations of proteins. Its small size leads to a rapid knock-in of this tag with other proteins through CRISPR/Cas9 technology.

== Applications ==
- Affinity purification
- Protein array
- TimeSTAMP protein labelling
- Western blotting
- Immunoprecipitation
- Protein-protein interactions
- Fluorescent tag
