= SBP-tag =

Amino acid sequence

The Streptavidin-Binding Peptide (SBP)-Tag is a 38-amino acid sequence that may be engineered into recombinant proteins. Recombinant proteins containing the SBP-Tag bind to streptavidin and this property may be utilized in specific purification, detection or immobilization strategies.

The sequence of the SBP tag is MDEKTTGWRGGHVVEGLAGELEQLRARLEHHPQGQREP.

== Discovery ==
The Streptavidin-Binding Peptide was discovered within a library of seven trillion stochastically generated peptides using the in vitro selection technique of mRNA Display. Selection was performed by incubating with streptavidin-agarose followed by elution with biotin. The SBP-Tag has been shown to bind streptavidin with an equilibrium dissociation constant of 2.5nM and is readily eluted with biotin under native conditions.

== Applications ==
=== Protein purification ===
Because of the mild elution conditions (biotin plus wash buffer) SBP-Tagged proteins can be generated in a relatively pure state with a single purification step. There are several relatively abundant mammalian proteins that inherently associate with the IMAC matrices that bind to the more commonly used Polyhistidine-tag (His-tag). For this reason non-IMAC purification protocols, including with the SBP-Tag, are often preferred for proteins that are expressed in mammalian cells.

=== Protein complex purification ===
Complexes of interacting proteins may also be purified using the SBP-Tag because elution with biotin permits recovery under conditions in which desired complexes remain associated. For example, the Condensin Complex was purified by Kim et al. [2010] and complexes with the TAZ transcriptional co-activator were purified by Zhang et al. [2009]. The SBP-Tag has also been incorporated into several Tandem Affinity Purification (TAP) systems in which successive purification steps are utilized with multiple tags, for example GFP fusion proteins and BTK-protein complexes were purified using a TAP protocol with the SBP-Tag and the His-Tag, HDGF-protein complexes were purified using a TAP protocol with the SBP-Tag and with the FLAG-tag and Wnt complexes were purified using a TAP protocol with the SBP-Tag and with the [Calmodulin-Tag]. TAP is generally used with protein complexes and several studies report significant improvements in purity and yield when the SBP-Tag TAP systems are compared to non-SBP-Tag systems. Commercial TAP systems that use the SBP-Tag include the Interplay® Adenoviral and Mammalian TAP Systems sold by Agilent Technologies, similar products are sold by Sigma-Aldrich.

=== Proteomics ===
Screens for biologically relevant protein-protein interactions have been performed using Tandem Affinity Purification (TAP) with the SBP-Tag and Protein A, for interaction proteomics and transcription factor complexes with the SBP-Tag and Protein G, for proteins that interact with the Dengue Virus protein DENV-2 NS4A with the SBP-Tag and the Calmodulin Tag. and for proteins that interact with protein phosphatase 2A (PP2A) with the SBP-Tag and the hemagglutinin (HA)-tag.

=== Imaging ===
The SBP-Tag will also bind to streptavidin or streptavidin reagents in solution. Applications of these engineered associations include the visualization of specific proteins within living cells, monitoring of the kinetics of the translation of individual proteins in an in vitro translation system, control of the integration of a multi-spanning membrane protein into the endoplasmic reticulum by fusing the SBP-Tag to the N-terminal translocation sequence and then halting integration with streptavidin and restarting integration with biotin. Fluorescent streptavidin reagents (e.g. streptavidin-HRP) can be used to visualize the SBP-tag by immunoblotting of SDS-PAGE. Additionally, antibodies to the SBP-tag are available commercially.

=== Surface plasmon resonance ===
The SBP-Tag has been used to reversibly immobilize recombinant proteins onto streptavidin-functionalized surfaces thereby permitting interaction assessment such as by surface plasmon resonance (SPR) techniques with re-use of the functionalized surface. SPR has also been used to compare the SBP-Tag with other streptavidin-binding peptides such as Strep-tag.

== See also ==
- Protein tag
