= Fluorescence-activating and absorption-shifting tag =

Protein tag

FAST (Fluorescence-Activating and absorption-Shifting Tag) is a genetically-encoded protein tag which, upon reversible combination with a fluorogenic chromophore, allows the reporting of proteins of interest. FAST, a small 14 kDa protein, was engineered from the photoactive yellow protein (PYP) by directed evolution. It was disclosed for the first time in 2016 by researchers from Ecole normale supérieure de Paris. FAST was further evolved into splitFAST (2019), a complementation system for protein-protein interaction monitoring, and CATCHFIRE (2023), a self-reporting protein dimerizing system.

== Mechanism ==
=== Fluorogenic protein-based strategies for labeling, sensing, and actuation ===
Fluorescence imaging has become ubiquitous in cell and molecular biology. GFP-like fluorescent proteins have revolutionized fluorescence microscopy, giving researchers exquisite control over the localization, function and fate, of tagged constructs. Lately, have been developed alternative systems based on a fluorogenic interaction between a protein tag, which affords the classic advantages of protein tagging, i.e., absolute labeling specificity and localization, and an external chromophore, dark until combination with its cognate protein tag. Chromophores span from naturally occurring chromophores, e.g., flavin mononucleotide (FMN) with LOV-sensing domains, biliverdin with phytochromes, bilirubin with UnaG, to synthetic fluorophores with SNAP-tag, CLIP-tag, HaloTag. While initially designed as fluorescent labels, these systems also present opportunities for sensing and actuating.

FAST and its derivates, splitFAST and CATCHFIRE, pertain to these novel chemical-genetic strategies.

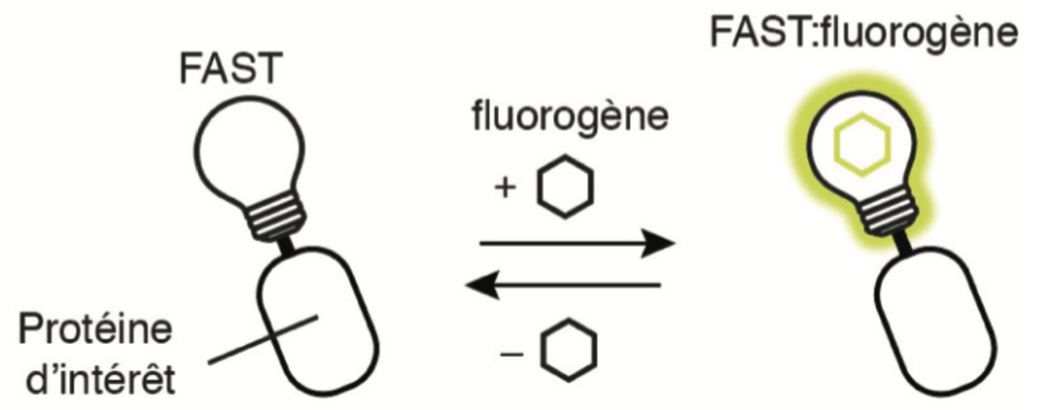
Reversible binding between FAST and a fluorogene

=== FAST ===
FAST is a 125 amino acid protein engineered from the photosensitive PYP. Not fluorescent by itself, it can bind selectively a fluorogenic chromophore derived from 4-hydroxybenzylidene rhodanine, which is itself non fluorescent unless bound. Once bound, the pair of molecules goes through a unique fluorogen activation mechanism based on two spectroscopic changes, increase of fluorescence quantum yield and absorption red shift, hence providing high labeling selectivity. Several versions of FAST have been described differing by a small number of mutations, e.g., Y-FAST, iFAST, pFAST, greenFAST, redFAST, frFAST, nirFAST, nanoFAST, or dimers of those. Also, a number of fluorogenic chromophores were developed, varying by their emission wavelength, their brightness and their tag affinity. Some are non permeant, i.e., they can't go through cell membranes, hence specifically labeling membrane proteins or extracellular proteins, allowing for, e.g., monitoring trafficking from synthesis until excretion.

FAST participates in the race towards near infra-red reporting, much needed for full organism imaging, while allowing deep tissue penetration, reduced photodamage to living organisms, and a high signal-to-noise ratio.

FAST and pFAST nucleic sequences are available at FPbase.

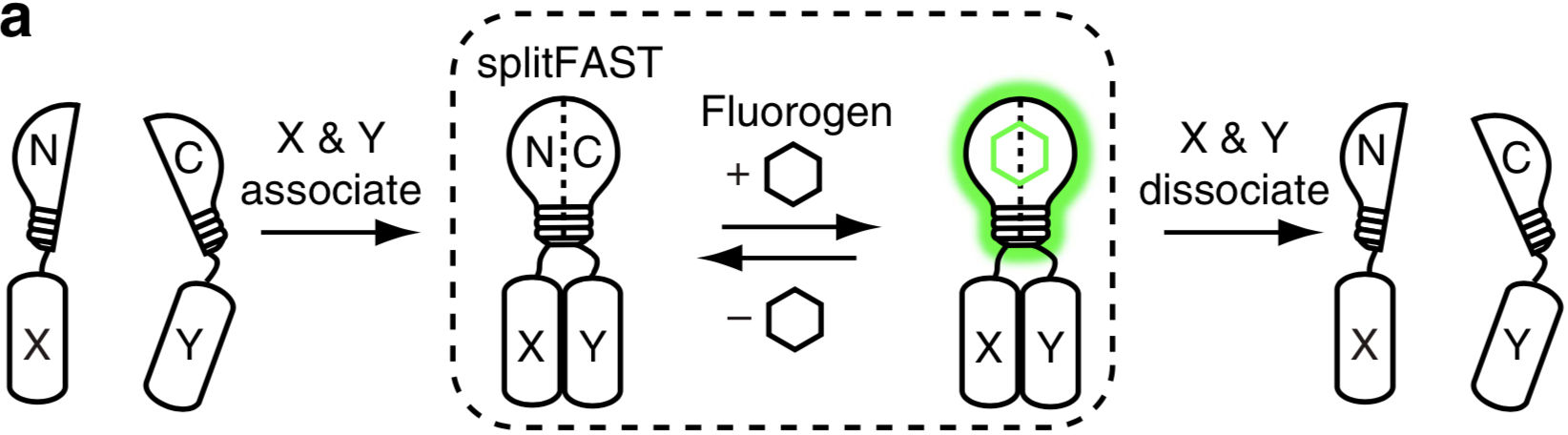
splitFAST, a split fluorescent reporter

=== splitFAST ===
splitFAST is a fluorescent complementation system for the visualization of transient protein-protein interactions in living cells. Engineered from the fluorogenic reporter FAST, splitFAST consists of two peptidic moieties, NFAST (114 amino acids) and CFAST (10 or 11 amino acids). Each being genetically fused to one protein of interest, they, upon interaction of their corresponding proteins, reconstitute the complete FAST which is then capable to combine with a FAST fluorogen and illuminate the interaction. splitFAST offers a powerful alternative to conventional imaging techniques for protein-protein interactions, i.e., Föster Resonance Energy Transfer (FRET) and bimolecular fluorescence complementation (BiFC). Indeed, easy to implement, splitFAST complementation is reversible, which allows not only real-time monitoring of protein complex assembly but also disassembly.

A tripartite splitFAST was further developed.

=== CATCHFIRE ===
An evolution of FAST and splitFAST, CATCHFIRE implements the genetic fusion of a pair of proteins of interest to FAST-based dimerizing domains, ^{FIRE}tag and ^{FIRE}mate. The addition of fluorogenic inducers, i.e., small molecules of the "match" series, e.g., ^{match}550, ^{match}715, ^{match}Dark, drives the interaction between ^{FIRE}tag and ^{FIRE}mate, hence inducing the proximity of proteins of interest. When both domains interact, then the match molecule sees its fluorescence increase by 100X. One can then observe the newly induced interaction by fluorescence microscopy. A further key feature of CATCHFIRE is its reversibility, hence the first ever self-reporting reversible dimerizing system. CATCHFIRE allows the control and tracking of protein localization, protein trafficking, organelle transport and cellular processes, opening avenues for studying or controlling biological processes with high spatiotemporal resolution. Its fluorogenic nature allows the design of a new class of biosensors for the study of processes such as signal transduction and apoptosis.

== Applications ==
The FAST-fluorogen reporting system is used to explore the living world, from protein reporting (e.g., for protein trafficking), protein-protein interaction monitoring (and a number of biosensors), to chemically induced dimerization. It is implemented in fluorescence microscopy, flow cytometry and any other fluorometric methods. FAST has also been reported for super-resolution microscopy of living cells.

=== In anaerobic microbiology ===
Because of its unique capacity of fluorescence in zero-oxygen conditions, FAST has been widely used in anaerobes, for example to enable metabolic engineering of Clostridium or related bacteria long known in biomass fermentation. For the same purpose, it has been implemented in methanogenic archaea, namely Methanococcus maripaludis and Methanosarcina acetivorans. It was also implemented for pathogen studies, i.e., Clostridioides difficile, Clostridium perfringens, and Giardia intestinalis.

Besides, FAST allows to monitor microbial activity in low oxygen conditions such as maturing biofilms or in tumors or gut microbiota.

=== In non-anerobic microbiology ===
Building on their small size and reversibility, hence limited impact on protein function and interactions, FAST and splitFAST have been used in fungi, namely Saccharomyces cerevisiae, to monitor metabolic engineering, and in pathological bacteria, namely Listeria monocytogenes, to explore their bacterial virulence factors.

=== In mammalian cells ===
Beyond microorganisms, FAST and splitFAST have started wide spreading across mechanism studies in mammalian cells. They helped elucidate the role of a special GPCR in dendritic spine maturation as well as a mechanism of action of the interferon-inducible MX1 protein against influenza A. splitFAST has been used in studies of membrane contact sites (MCSs) between membranous organelles such as endoplasmic reticulum and mitochondria or lipid droplets, a raising area in medical research.
