= FLAG-tag =

Particular peptide protein tag

FLAG-tag, or FLAG octapeptide, or FLAG epitope, is a peptide protein tag that can be added to a protein using recombinant DNA technology, having the sequence DYKDDDDK (where D=aspartic acid, Y=tyrosine, and K=lysine). It is one of the most specific tags and it is an artificial antigen to which specific, high affinity monoclonal antibodies have been developed and hence can be used for protein purification by affinity chromatography and also can be used for locating proteins within living cells. FLAG-tag has been used to separate recombinant, overexpressed protein from wild-type protein expressed by the host organism. FLAG-tag can also be used in the isolation of protein complexes with multiple subunits, because FLAG-tag's mild purification procedure tends not to disrupt such complexes. FLAG-tag-based purification has been used to obtain proteins of sufficient purity and quality to carry out 3D structure determination by x-ray crystallography.

A FLAG-tag can be used in many different assays that require recognition by an antibody. If there is no antibody against a given protein, adding a FLAG-tag to a protein allows the protein to be studied with an antibody against the FLAG-tag sequence. Examples are cellular localization studies by immunofluorescence, immunoprecipitation or detection by SDS PAGE protein electrophoresis and Western blotting.

The peptide sequence of the FLAG-tag from the N-terminus to the C-terminus is: DYKDDDDK (1012 Da). Additionally, FLAG-tags may be used in tandem, commonly the 3xFLAG peptide: DYKDHD-G-DYKDHD-I-DYKDDDDK (with the final tag encoding an enterokinase cleavage site). FLAG-tag can be fused to the C-terminus or the N-terminus of a protein, or inserted within a protein. Some commercially available antibodies (e.g., M1/4E11) recognize the epitope only when FLAG-tag is present at the N-terminus. However, other available antibodies (e.g., M2) are position-insensitive. The tyrosine residue in the FLAG-tag can be sulfated when expressed on certain secreted proteins, which can affect antibody recognition of the FLAG epitope. The FLAG-tag can be used in conjunction with other affinity tags, for example a polyhistidine tag (His-tag), HA-tag or myc-tag.

== History ==
The first use of epitope tagging was described by Munro and Pelham in 1984. The FLAG-tag was the second example of a fully functional, improved epitope tag, published in the scientific literature. and was the only epitope tag to be patented. It has since become one of the most commonly used protein tags in laboratories worldwide. Unlike some other tags (e.g. myc, HA), where a monoclonal antibody was first isolated against an existing protein, then the epitope was characterized and used as a tag, the FLAG epitope was an idealized, artificial design, to which monoclonal antibodies were raised. The FLAG-tag's sequence was optimized for compatibility with proteins it is attached to, in that FLAG-tag is more hydrophilic than other common epitope tags and therefore less likely to reduce the activity of proteins to which FLAG-tag is appended. In addition, N-terminal FLAG tags can be removed readily from proteins once they have been isolated, by treatment with the specific protease, enterokinase (enteropeptidase).

The third report of epitope tagging, (HA-tag), appeared about one year after the Flag system had been first shipped.

== See also ==
- Protein tag
- SpyTag
