= International Criminal Tribunal =

International Criminal Tribunal or International Crimes Tribunal may refer to:

- International Crimes Tribunal (Bangladesh)
- International Criminal Tribunal for the former Yugoslavia (ICTY)
- International Criminal Tribunal for Rwanda (ICTR)
- various ones for crimes against humanity, see Crimes against humanity

== See also ==
- International Criminal Court
- International Court of Justice
- World Court (disambiguation)
- ICT (disambiguation)
