= ICTS =

ICTS may refer to:

- ICTS International, a Dutch firm of aviation and general security
- Intermediate Capacity Transit System (now Innovia Metro), a metro system
- International Centre for Theoretical Sciences
- International Container Terminal Services, a port management company in the Philippines
- Iranian Center for Translation Studies
- Iraqi Counter Terrorism Service

== See also ==
- ICT (disambiguation)
