= Beta-aspartyl-peptidase =

Identifiers
- EC no.: 3.4.19.5
- CAS no.: 37288-74-7

Databases
- IntEnz: IntEnz view
- BRENDA: BRENDA entry
- ExPASy: NiceZyme view
- KEGG: KEGG entry
- MetaCyc: metabolic pathway
- PRIAM: profile
- PDB structures: RCSB PDB PDBe PDBsum
Search
- PMC: articles
- PubMed: articles
- NCBI: proteins

Beta-aspartyl-peptidase (EC 3.4.19.5, beta-aspartyl dipeptidase, beta-aspartyl peptidase, beta-aspartyldipeptidase) is an enzyme. This enzyme catalyses the following chemical reaction

Cleavage of a beta-linked Asp residue from the N-terminus of a polypeptide

Other isopeptide bonds, e.g. gamma-glutamyl and beta-alanyl, are not hydrolysed.
