= HelicoCARE direct =

- Purpose: whole-blood antibody test

helicoCARE direct is a Helicobacter pylori whole-blood antibody test that was introduced worldwide in 2006. It is manufactured by CARE diagnostica. It is an immunochromatographic test which detects the presence of antibodies against H. pylori in whole-blood samples. This test is suitable for screening large populations for peptic ulcer disease.
