= NE-tag =

The NE-tag is a synthetic peptide tag (NE tag) designed as an epitope tag for detection, quantification and purification of recombinant protein. This patented peptide sequence is composed of eighteen hydrophilic amino acids. This short peptide does not adopt any significant homology to any existing proteins found in nature. This synthetic NE peptide adopts random coil conformation and showing strong immunogenicity (computational prediction). This is advantageous to offer stringent specificity to the NE-tagged proteins, which are readily to be detected, quantitated, and purified.

== Detection ==
The NE-tag can be specifically detected using a monoclonal anti-NE detection antibody - an affinity-purified mouse immunoglobulin, IgG1, which specifically binds to NE-tagged proteins. This peptide-to-antibody conjugation is validated in Western blotting, immunoprecipitation (IP), immunocytochemistry (IHC), and affinity purification of NE fusion proteins (i.e. affinity column).

== Sequences ==
- The DNA sequence of NE-tag is as follows: 5' ACC AAA gAA AAC CCg CgT AgC AAC Cag gAA gAA AgC TAT gAT gAT AAC gAA AgC 3'
- The corresponding amino acid sequence is: TKENPRSNQEESYDDNES (Thr-Lys-Glu-Asn-Pro-Arg-Ser-Asn-Gln-Glu-Glu-Ser-Tyr-Asp-Asp-Asn-Glu-Ser)

== Patents ==
- US 8927225
- EP 2328909
- CN 102203119
