= Spot-tag =

A Spot-tag is a 12-amino acid peptide tag recognized by a single-domain antibody (sdAb, or nanobody). Due to the small size of a Spot-tag (12 amino acids) and the robust Spot-nanobody (14.7 kD) that specifically binds to Spot-tagged proteins, Spot-tag can be used for multiple capture and detection applications: Immunoprecipitation, affinity purification, immunofluorescence, and super-resolution microscopy. Recombinant proteins can be engineered to express the Spot-tag.

== Spot-tag Sequence ==
=== Amino acid sequence ===
PDRVRAVSHWSS

=== Codon optimized DNA sequence ===
Human	CCA GAC CGC GTG CGC GCC GTG AGC CAT TGG AGC AGC
S. cerevisiae	CCA GAT AGA GTT AGA GCT GTT TCT CAT TGG TCT TCT
E. coli	CCG GAT CGC GTG CGC GCA GTC TCT CAC TGG AGC AGC

== See also ==
- Protein tag
