= AP20187 =

Names
- IUPAC name 2,2′-[[2-[(dimethylamino)methyl]-1,3-propanediyl]bis[imino(2-oxo-2,1-ethanediyl)oxy-3,1-phenylene[(1R)-3-(3,4-dimethoxyphenyl)propylidene]]] ester
- Other names (2S,2′S)-1-[(2S)-1-oxo-2-(3,4,5-trimethoxyphenyl)butyl]-2-piperidinecarboxylic acid B/B Homodimerizer

Identifiers
CAS Number	195514-80-8
3D model (JSmol)	Interactive image
ChEBI	CHEBI:136847
PubChem CID	78357784
CompTox Dashboard (EPA)	DTXSID101098203
- InChI: InChI=1S/C82H107N5O20/c1-15-61(57-43-71(98-9)77(102-13)72(44-57)99-10)79(90)86-37-19-17-27-63(86)81(92)106-65(33-29-52-31-35-67(94-5)69(39-52)96-7)55-23-21-25-59(41-55)104-50-75(88)83-47-54(49-85(3)4)48-84-76(89)51-105-60-26-22-24-56(42-60)66(34-30-53-32-36-68(95-6)70(40-53)97-8)107-82(93)64-28-18-20-38-87(64)80(91)62(16-2)58-45-73(100-11)78(103-14)74(46-58)101-12/h21-26,31-32,35-36,39-46,54,61-66H,15-20,27-30,33-34,37-38,47-51H2,1-14H3,(H,83,88)(H,84,89)/t61-,62-,63-,64-,65+,66+/m0/s1 Key: NSBGUMKAXUXKGI-BPNHAYRBSA-N
- SMILES: CCC(C1=CC(=C(C(=C1)OC)OC)OC)C(=O)N2CCCCC2C(=O)OC(CCC3=CC(=C(C=C3)OC)OC)C4=CC(=CC=C4)OCC(=O)NCC(CNC(=O)COC5=CC=CC(=C5)C(CCC6=CC(=C(C=C6)OC)OC)OC(=O)C7CCCCN7C(=O)C(CC)C8=CC(=C(C(=C8)OC)OC)OC)CN(C)C

Properties
Chemical formula	C_{82}H_{107}N_{5}O_{20}
Molar mass	1482.773 g·mol^{−1}
Appearance	White to beige powder
Solubility	2 mg/mL in DMSO
- Except where otherwise noted, data are given for materials in their standard state (at 25 °C [77 °F], 100 kPa). Infobox references

AP20187 is a ligand that can induce homodimerization of fusion proteins containing the F36V mutant of an FKBP domain(FKBPF36V), available commercially as the DmrB domain.
