= Photoactive yellow protein =

PYP

Identifiers
- Symbol: PYP
- Pfam: PF00989
- InterPro: IPR012130
- SMART: SM00091
- PROSITE: PS50112
- SCOP2: 55786 / SCOPe / SUPFAM
- CDD: cd00130
Available protein structures:
- PDB: IPR012130 PF00989 (ECOD; PDBsum)
- AlphaFold: IPR012130; PF00989

In molecular biology, the PYP domain (photoactive yellow protein) is a p-coumaric acid-binding protein domain. They are present in various proteins in bacteria.

PYP is a highly soluble globular protein with an alpha/beta fold structure. It is a member of the PAS domain superfamily, which also contains a variety of other kinds of photosensory proteins.

PYP was first discovered in 1985.

A recently (2016) developed chemogenetic system named FAST (Fluorescence-Activating and absorption Shifting Tag) was engineered from PYP to specifically and reversibly bind a series of hydroxybenzylidene rhodanine (HBR) derivatives for their fluorogenic properties. Upon interaction with FAST, the fluorogen is locked into a fluorescent conformation unlike when in solution. This new protein labelling system is used in a variety of microscopy and cytometry setups.

== p-Coumaric acid ==
p-Coumaric acid is a cofactor of PYP. Adducts of p-coumaric acid bound to PYP form crystals that diffract well for x-ray crystallography experiments. These structural studies have provided insight into photosensitive proteins, e.g. the role of hydrogen bonding, molecular isomerization and photoactivity.

=== Photochemical transitions ===
It was originally believed that due to light emissions resembling that of retinal bound rhodopsin, the photosensor molecule bound to PYP should resemble the structure of retinal bound rhodopsin, the photosensor molecule bound to PYP should resemble the structure of retinal. Scientists were therefore amazed when the PYP Cys 69 was bound by a thiol ester linkage to the light sensitive prosthetic group p-coumaric acid. During the photoreactive mechanism:

1. Light absorption yields the native protein to absorb a maximum wavelength of 446 nm, ε = 45500 M^{−1} cm^{−1}.
2. Within a nanosecond the absorbed maximum wavelength is shifted to 465 nm.
3. Then on a sub-millisecond timescale is excited to a 355 nm state.

p-Coumaric acid exhibiting trans–cis isomerization due to absorption of light causing photochemical transitions. To the right demonstrates the molecular structure of p-coumaric acid in the ligand binding site and hydrogen bonding interactions involved in the innate oxyanion hole. To the left is a crystallographic image of p-coumaric acid in the ligand binding site based on PDB: 2PYP PyMOL rendering.

These observed phenomena are due to the trans–cis isomerization of the vinyl trans double bond in the p-coumaric acid. Scientists noted by observing the crystal structure of p-coumaric acid bound by PYP that the hydroxyl group connected to the C4 carbon of the phenyl ring appeared to be deprotonated – effectively a phenolate functional group. This was due to abnormally short hydrogen bonding lengths observed in the protein crystal structure.

=== Role of hydrogen bonding ===
Hydrogen bonds in proteins such as PYP take part in interrelated networks, where at the center of p-coumaric acid's phenolate O4 atom, there is an oxyanion hole that is crucial for photosensory function. Oxyanion holes exist in enzymes to stabilize transitions states of reaction intermediates, thus stabilizing the trans–cis isomerization of p-coumaric acid. During the transition state it is believed that the p-coumaric acid phenolate O4 takes part in a hydrogen bond network between Glu46, Tyr42 and Thr50 of PYP. These interactions are apart from the thiol ester linkage to Cys 69 keeping p-coumaric acid in the ligand binding site. Upon transitioning to the cis-isomeric form of p-coumaric acid the favorable hydrogen bonds are no longer in close interaction.
