= Epitope =

Chemical entity which can be bound by an antibody

An epitope, (/ˈɛpɪtoʊp/) also known as antigenic determinant, is the part of an antigen that is recognized by the immune system, specifically by antibodies, B cells, or T cells. The part of an antibody that binds to the epitope is called a paratope. Although epitopes are usually non-self proteins, sequences derived from the host that can be recognized (as in the case of autoimmune diseases) are also epitopes.

The epitopes of protein antigens are divided into two categories, conformational epitopes and linear epitopes, based on their structure and interaction with the paratope. Conformational and linear epitopes interact with the paratope based on the 3-D conformation adopted by the epitope, which is determined by the surface features of the involved epitope residues and the shape or tertiary structure of other segments of the antigen. A conformational epitope is formed by the 3-D conformation adopted by the interaction of discontiguous amino acid residues. In contrast, a linear epitope is formed by the 3-D conformation adopted by the interaction of contiguous amino acid residues. A linear epitope is not determined solely by the primary structure of the involved amino acids. Residues that flank such amino acid residues, as well as more distant amino acid residues of the antigen affect the ability of the primary structure residues to adopt the epitope's 3-D conformation. 90% of epitopes are conformational.

== Function ==
=== T cell epitopes ===
T cell epitopes are presented on the surface of an antigen-presenting cell, where they are bound to major histocompatibility complex (MHC) molecules. In humans, professional antigen-presenting cells are specialized to present MHC class II peptides, whereas most nucleated somatic cells present MHC class I peptides. T cell epitopes presented by MHC class I molecules are typically peptides between 8 and 11 amino acids in length, whereas MHC class II molecules present longer peptides, 13–17 amino acids in length, and non-classical MHC molecules also present non-peptidic epitopes such as glycolipids.

=== B cell epitopes ===
The part of the antigen that immunoglobulin or antibodies bind to is called a B-cell epitope. B cell epitopes can be divided into two groups: conformational or linear. B cell epitopes are mainly conformational. There are additional epitope types when the quaternary structure is considered. Epitopes that are masked when protein subunits aggregate are called cryptotopes. Neotopes are epitopes that are only recognized while in a specific quaternary structure and the residues of the epitope can span multiple protein subunits. Neotopes are not recognized once the subunits dissociate.

=== Cross-activity ===
Epitopes are sometimes cross-reactive. Antibodies can themselves be recognised by other antibodies. Anti-idiotypic antibodies bind to antigenic determinants, called idiotopes, in the variable regions of other antibodies. Interactions between idiotypes and anti-idiotypic antibodies form the basis of Niels Jerne’s immune network hypothesis. In experimental systems, anti-idiotypic antibodies can enhance or suppress subsequent antibody responses.

== Epitope mapping ==
=== T cell epitopes ===
MHC class I and II epitopes can be reliably predicted by computational means alone, although not all in-silico T cell epitope prediction algorithms are equivalent in their accuracy. There are two main methods of predicting peptide-MHC binding: data-driven and structure-based. Structure based methods model the peptide-MHC structure and require great computational power. Data-driven methods have higher predictive performance than structure-based methods. Data-driven methods predict peptide-MHC binding based on peptide sequences that bind MHC molecules. By identifying T-cell epitopes, scientists can track, phenotype, and stimulate T-cells.

=== B cell epitopes ===
There are two main methods of epitope mapping: either structural or functional studies. Methods for structurally mapping epitopes include X-ray crystallography, nuclear magnetic resonance, and electron microscopy. X-ray crystallography of Ag-Ab complexes is considered an accurate way to structurally map epitopes. Nuclear magnetic resonance can be used to map epitopes by using data about the Ag-Ab complex. This method does not require crystal formation but can only work on small peptides and proteins. Electron microscopy is a low-resolution method that can localize epitopes on larger antigens like virus particles.

Methods for functionally mapping epitopes often use binding assays such as western blot, dot blot, and/or ELISA to determine antibody binding. Competition methods look to determine if two monoclonal antibodies (mABs) can bind to an antigen at the same time or compete with each other to bind at the same site. Another technique involves high-throughput mutagenesis, an epitope mapping strategy developed to improve rapid mapping of conformational epitopes on structurally complex proteins. Mutagenesis uses randomly/site-directed mutations at individual residues to map epitopes. B-cell epitope mapping can be used for the development of antibody therapeutics, peptide-based vaccines, and immunodiagnostic tools.

== Epitope tags ==
Epitopes are often used in proteomics and the study of other gene products. Using recombinant DNA techniques genetic sequences coding for epitopes that are recognized by common antibodies can be fused to the gene. Following synthesis, the resulting epitope tag allows the antibody to find the protein or other gene product enabling lab techniques for localisation, purification, and further molecular characterization including identifying the protein's binding partners. Common epitopes used for this purpose are Myc-tag, HA-tag, FLAG-tag, GST-tag, 6xHis, V5-tag and OLLAS. An epitope tag was first described by Munro and Pelham to detect and track proteins in 1984. Tags were quickly adapted for purifying proteins and to detect, pull down, and clone interaction partners of proteins. These tags were originally referred to as "peptide tag", "epitope insertion", "marker sequence", and "epitope addition", until "epitope tag" was coined and popularized.

Peptides can also be bound by proteins that form covalent bonds to the peptide, allowing irreversible immobilisation. These strategies have also been successfully applied to the development of "epitope-focused" vaccine design.

== Epitope-based vaccines ==
The first epitope-based vaccine was developed in 1985 by Chaim Jacob and colleagues from The Weizmann Institute of Science. Epitope-based vaccines stimulate humoral and cellular immune responses using isolated B-cell or T-cell epitopes. These vaccines can use multiple epitopes to increase their efficacy. To find epitopes to use for the vaccine, in silico mapping is often used. Once candidate epitopes are found, the constructs are engineered and tested for vaccine efficiency. While epitope-based vaccines are generally safe, one possible side effect is cytokine storms.

== Neoantigenic determinant ==
A neoantigenic determinant is an epitope on a neoantigen, which is a newly formed antigen that has not been previously recognized by the immune system. Neoantigens are often associated with tumor antigens and are found in oncogenic cells. Neoantigens and, by extension, neoantigenic determinants can be formed when a protein undergoes further modification within a biochemical pathway such as glycosylation, phosphorylation or proteolysis. Post-translational modifications, including glycosylation, phosphorylation and proteolytic cleavage, can generate new antigenic determinants, known as neoepitopes. These modifications can alter antibody recognition or, when modified peptides are presented by MHC molecules, T-cell recognition.

== See also ==
- Cryptotope
- Epitope binning
- Mimotope
- Odotope
- Polyclonal B cell response
- Protein tag
- TimeSTAMP protein labelling
