= SNAP-tag =

Self-labeling protein tag

SNAP-tag reaction scheme

SNAP-tag® is a self-labeling protein tag commercially available in various expression vectors. SNAP-tag is a 182 residue polypeptide (19.4 kDa) that can be fused to any protein of interest and further specifically and covalently tagged with a suitable ligand, such as a fluorescent dye. Since its introduction, SNAP-tag has found numerous applications in biochemistry and for the investigation of the function and localisation of proteins and enzymes in living cells.

== Applications ==
Cell biology utilizes tools that allow manipulation and visualization of proteins in living cells. An important example is the use of fluorescent proteins, such as the green fluorescent protein (GFP) or yellow fluorescent protein (YFP). Molecular biology methods allow these fluorescent proteins to be introduced and expressed in living cells as fusion proteins. However, the photo-physical properties of the fluorescent proteins are generally not suited for single-molecule spectroscopy. Fluorescent proteins have, in comparison to commercially available dyes, a much lower fluorescence quantum yield and are quickly destroyed upon excitation with a focused laser beam (photobleaching).

The SNAP-tag® protein is an engineered version of the ubiquitous mammalian enzyme AGT, encoded in humans by the O-6-methylguanine-DNA methyltransferase (MGMT) gene. SNAP-tag was obtained using a directed evolution strategy, leading to a hAGT variant that accepts O^{6}-benzylguanine derivatives instead of repairing alkylated guanine derivatives in damaged DNA.

An orthogonal tag, called CLIP-tag™, was further engineered from SNAP-tag to accept O^{2}-benzylcytosine derivatives as substrates, instead of O^{6}-benzylguanine. Therefore, Clip-tag- and SNAP-tag-fused proteins can be labeled simultaneously in the same cells. A split-SNAP-tag version suitable for protein complementation assay and protein-protein interaction studies was later developed.

Apart from fluorescence microscopy, SNAP-tag and CLIP-tag have proven useful in the elucidation of numerous biological processes, including the identification of multiprotein complexes using various approaches such as FRET, cross-linking, proximity ligation assay, as well as the purification of insulin secretory granules of distinct age by doing pulse-chase experiments Other application include the measurement of protein half-lives in vivo, and small molecule-protein interactions. SNAP-tag® is a registered trademark of New England Biolabs, Inc. CLIP-tag™ is a trademark of New England Biolabs, Inc.

== See also ==
- Protein tag
- HaloTag
- SpyTag
- Fluorescent proteins
