= HA-tag =

Surface glycoprotein

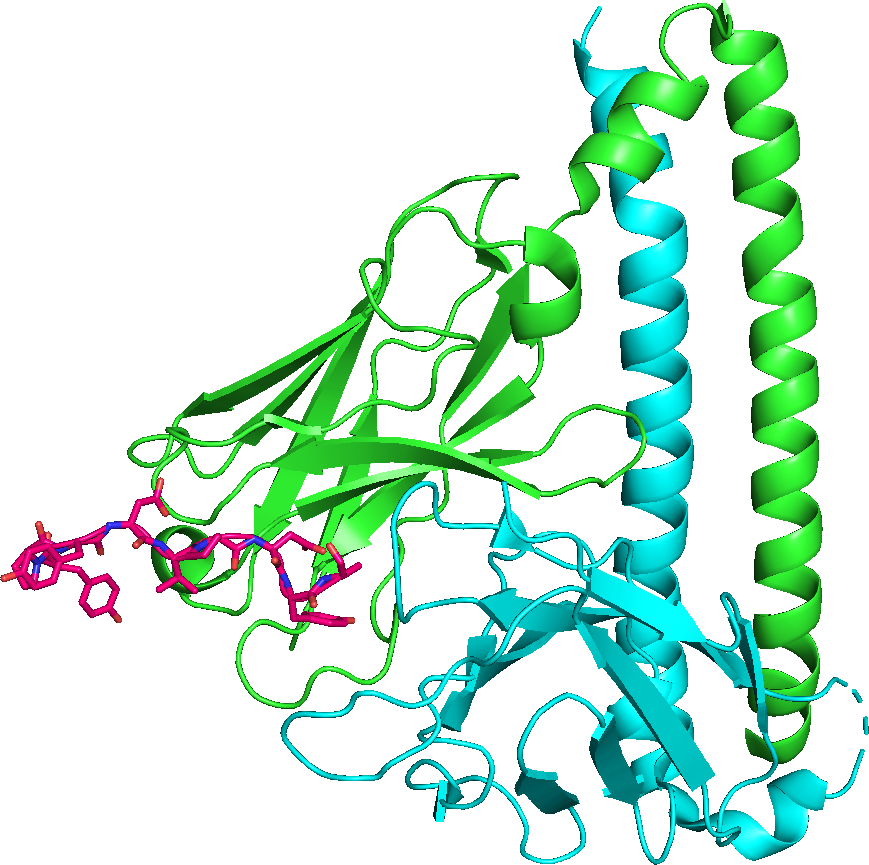
12CA5 Fv-clasp fragment (green, cyan) with its antigen peptide, YPYDVPDYA (magenta), which is used as HA tag. Image created with PyMOL from PDB: 5XCS.

The HA-tag is a protein tag derived from the human influenza hemagglutinin (HA) protein, which allows the virus to target and enter host cells. An HA-tag is composed of a peptide derived from the HA-molecule corresponding to amino acids 98-106, which can be recognized and selectively bound by commercially available antibodies. This makes HA a powerful tool in molecular biology, commonly included in expression vectors and in the production of recombinant proteins. Like other epitope tags, HA-tag is small and generally does not alter the traits of proteins it is attached to. As a result HA-tags are often used to identify protein-protein interactions or to detect protein expression, using Co-Immunoprecipitation or Western blot respectively.

The HA-tag is not suitable for detection or purification of proteins from apoptotic cells since it is cleaved by Caspase-3 and / or Caspase-7 after its sequence DVPD, causing it to lose its immunoreactivity. Labeling of endogenous proteins with HA-tag using CRISPR was recently accomplished in-vivo in differentiated neurons.

== Sequence ==
The DNA sequences for the HA-tag include: 5'-TAC-CCA-TAC-GAT-GTT-CCA-GAT-TAC-GCT-3' or 5'-TAT-CCA-TAT-GAT-GTT-CCA-GAT-TAT-GCT-3'. The resulting amino acid sequence is YPYDVPDYA (Tyr-Pro-Tyr-Asp-Val-Pro-Asp-Tyr-Ala).

== See also ==
- Protein tag
- SpyTag
