= Isopeptag =

Isopeptag is a 16-amino acid peptide tag (TDKDMTITFTNKKDAE) that can be genetically linked to proteins without interfering with protein folding. What makes the isopeptag different from other peptide tags is that it can bind its binding protein through a permanent and irreversible covalent bond. Other peptide tags generally bind their targets through weak non-covalent interactions, thus limiting their use in applications where molecules experience extreme forces. The isopeptag's covalent binding to its target overcomes these barriers and allows target proteins to be studied in harsher molecular environments.

== Development ==
The isopeptag was developed by dissecting the pilin protein (Spy0128) from Streptococcus pyogenes. Spy0128 contains two intramolecular isopeptide bonds, and to generate the isopeptag one of these bonds was split by removing the last β-strand in the protein.

== Mode of action ==
When the isopeptag is bound to a target protein, it spontaneously binds its binding partner through an isopeptide bond, an amide bond formed autocatalytically. The reaction is robust and occurs at various temperatures from 4-37 °C, a pH range of 5–8, and in the presence of commonly used detergents. Also, the reaction is independent of the redox state of the environment and can occur equally well in both reducing and oxidizing conditions.

== Applications ==
The covalent binding of the isopeptag to its binding partner can be used to permanently link proteins together in the complex environment of a bacterial cell, to target proteins of interest for cellular imaging, and to develop new protein structures.
