= HaloTag =

Self-labeling protein tag

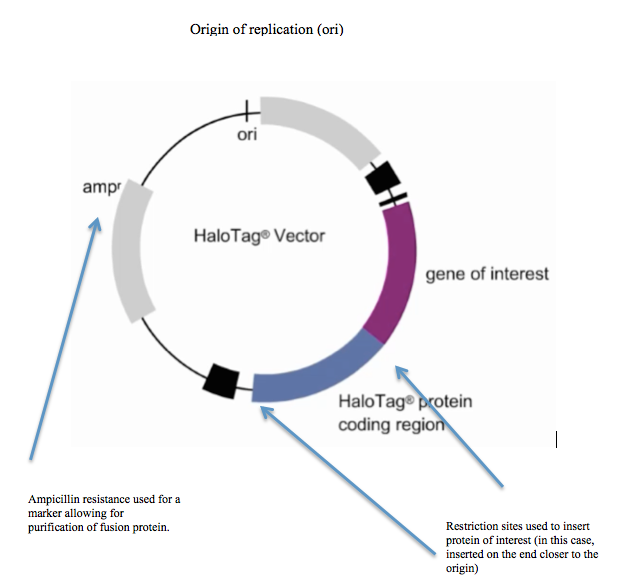
HaloTag protein coding region can be inserted near the gene of interest. An ampicillin resistance gene is also inserted for purification purposes.

HaloTag is a self-labeling protein tag. It is a 297 residue protein (33 kDa) derived from a bacterial enzyme, designed to covalently bind to a synthetic ligand. The bacterial enzyme can be fused to various proteins of interest. The synthetic ligand is chosen from a number of available ligands in accordance with the type of experiments to be performed. This bacterial enzyme is a haloalkane dehalogenase, which acts as a hydrolase and is designed to facilitate visualization of the subcellular localization of a protein of interest, immobilization of a protein of interest, or capture of the binding partners of a protein of interest within its biochemical environment. The HaloTag is composed of two covalently bound segments including a haloalkane dehalogenase and a synthetic ligand of choice. These synthetic ligands consist of a reactive chloroalkane linker bound to a functional group. Functional groups can either be biotin (can be used as an affinity tag) or can be chosen from five available fluorescent dyes including Coumarin, Oregon Green, Alexa Fluor 488, diAcFAM, and TMR. These fluorescent dyes can be used in the visualization of either living or chemically fixed cells.

== Mechanism ==
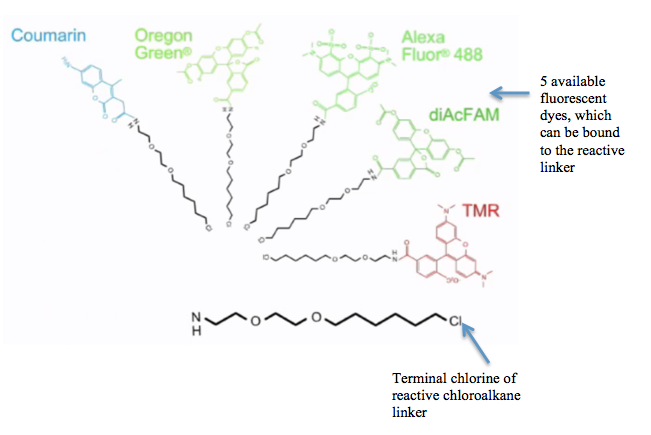
Five available fluorescent dyes that can be bound to the reactive linker. In addition, the terminal chlorine of the reactive chloroalkane can be visualized.

The HaloTag is a hydrolase, which has a genetically modified active site, which specifically binds the reactive chloroalkane linker and has an increased rate of ligand binding. The reaction that forms the bond between the protein tag and chloroalkane linker is fast and essentially irreversible under physiological conditions due to the terminal chlorine of the linker portion. In the aforementioned reaction, nucleophilic attack of the chloroalkane reactive linker causes displacement of the halogen with an amino acid residue, which results in the formation of a covalent alkyl-enzyme intermediate. This intermediate would then be hydrolyzed by an amino acid residue within the wild-type hydrolase. This would lead to regeneration of the enzyme following the reaction. However, in the modified haloalkane dehalogenase (HaloTag), the reaction intermediate cannot proceed through a subsequent reaction because it cannot be hydrolyzed due to the mutation in the enzyme. This causes the intermediate to persist as a stable covalent adduct with which there is no associated back reaction.

== Uses ==
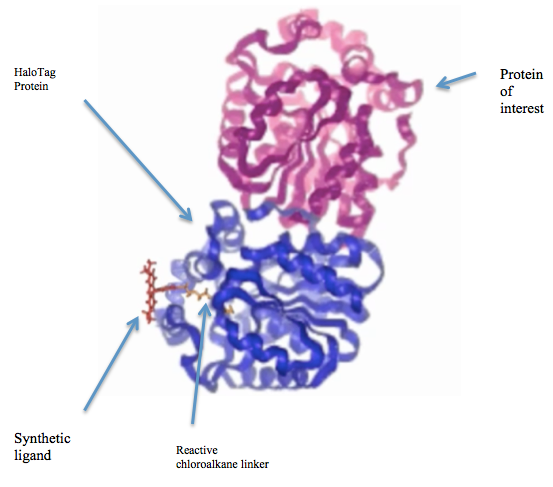
Different parts of the fusion protein. As illustrated in the figure, HaloTag protein consists of the synthetic ligand and reactive chloroalkane linker parts. The HaloTag protein is attached to the protein of interest.

HaloTagged fusion proteins can be expressed using standard recombinant protein expression techniques. Furthermore, there are several commercial vectors available that just require insertion of a gene of interest. Since bacterial dehalogenases are relatively small and the reactions described above are foreign to mammalian cells, there is no interference by endogenous mammalian metabolic reactions. Once the fusion protein has been expressed, there is a wide range of potential areas of experimentation including enzymatic assays, cellular imaging, protein arrays, determination of sub-cellular localization, and many additional possibilities.

Recently, HaloTag has been engineered to create hybrid protein + small molecule biosensors of neuronal activity. These sensors undergo a conformational change in response to calcium concentration spikes during neuronal firing; this conformational change modulates the conformation of a HaloTag-bound dye molecule.

== See also ==
- Protein tag
- SNAP tag
- SpyTag
- Fluorescent proteins
