= Cryptotope =

A cryptotope is an antigenic site or epitope hidden in a protein or virion by surface subunits. Cryptotopes are antigenically active only after the dissociation of protein aggregates and virions. Some infectious pathogens are known to escape immunological targeting by B-cells by masking antigen-binding sites as cryptotopes. A cryptotope can also be referred to as a cryptic epitope. Cryptotopes are becoming important for HIV vaccine research as a number of studies have shown that cryptic epitopes can be revealed or exposed when HIV gp120 binds to CD4.
