= ICT =

ICT may refer to:

== Sciences and technology ==
- Information and communication technology.
- Image Constraint Token, in video processing.
- Immunochromatographic test, a rapid immunoassay used to detect diseases such as anthrax.
- In-circuit test, in electronics.
- Inflammation of connective tissue, in medicine.
- Insulin coma therapy, a form of psychiatric treatment.

== Agencies, businesses and organizations ==
=== Government agencies ===
- Costa Rican Tourism Board (Spanish: Instituto Costarricense de Turismo).
- Information and Communication Technology Authority, a Kenyan Government-owned corporation.

=== Other organizations ===
- Institute for Creative Technologies, University of Southern California.
- Institute of Chemical Technology, Mumbai, India.
- Institute of Computing Technology (CAS), Beijing, China.
- International Campaign for Tibet, headquartered in Washington, DC.
- International Computers and Tabulators, a British computing company, now part of Fujitsu Services.
- International Institute for Counter-Terrorism, Herzliya, Israel.
- Inverness Caledonian Thistle F.C., a Scottish football club.
- International City Theater, a theatre in Long Beach, California.
- International Crimes Tribunal (disambiguation).

== Other uses ==
- Islamabad Capital Territory, a federal territory of Pakistan
- ICT, the IATA code for Wichita Dwight D. Eisenhower National Airport.
- ICT News, formerly Indian Country Today, a digital news platform in the United States.
- Indochina Time, a time zone of UTC+07:00.
- Intercollegiate Championship Tournament, a US quiz competition.
- Innovative Clean Transit rule.
- ICC Champions Trophy, cricket tournament.

== See also ==
- Ice-T, rapper and actor.
- ICTS (disambiguation).
