= Michael Z. Lin =

Taiwanese-American biochemist and bioengineer

- Born: 1973 (age 52–53); Taipei, Taiwan
- Education: Harvard University (BA, PhD); University of California, Los Angeles (MD)
- Known for: Genetically encoded voltage indicator, optogenetics, chemogenetics
- Scientific career
- Fields: Biochemistry
- Workplaces: Stanford University
- Doctoral advisor: Michael E. Greenberg
- Other academic advisors: Roger Y. Tsien

Michael Z. Lin (born 1973) is a Taiwanese-American biochemist and bioengineer. He is a professor of neurobiology and bioengineering at Stanford University. He is best known for his work on engineering optically and chemically controllable proteins.

== Education and career ==
Lin graduated from Harvard University in 1994 with a degree in biochemical sciences summa cum laude. He subsequently trained as a PhD student studying neuronal signal transduction with Michael E. Greenberg at Harvard Medical School, graduating in 2002, and obtained a M.D. at UCLA in 2004. Lin then performed postdoctoral research with Chemistry Nobel Prize Laureate Roger Y. Tsien at UCSD. Since 2009, he has been a member of the faculty at the Stanford University School of Medicine.

== Research ==
During postdoctoral training with Roger Y. Tsien, Lin developed improved red fluorescent proteins and channelrhodopsins, and pioneered the use of drug-regulated proteases for protein modification in the TimeSTAMP protein labelling method. Lin's group at Stanford University has engineered proteins with novel functions for optogenetics, chemogenetics, and synthetic biology. Notable inventions include:

- Red fluorescent and bioluminescent proteins
- Optically switchable proteins using an engineered green fluorescent protein
- The ASAP genetically encoded voltage indicator family
- Chemical control of protein expression by proteases of RNA viruses
- Synthetic proteins that rewire cancer signals to therapeutic activation
- SARS-CoV-2 protease inhibitors based on modifying HCV protease inhibitors

== Awards and honors ==
- Burroughs Wellcome Fund Career Award in Medical Sciences (2007)
- National Institutes of Health Director's Pioneer Award (2013)
- Rita Allen Foundation Scholar (2016)
- World Molecular Imaging Society Roger Tsien Awardee for Excellence in Chemical Biology (2019)

== See also ==
- Genetically encoded voltage indicator
- Optogenetics
- Chemogenetics
- Chemical biology
- Synthetic biology
- Medicinal chemistry
