= Isopeptide bond =

Type of chemical bond between 2 amino acids

Isopeptide bond between lysine and aspartate/asparagine

An isopeptide bond is a type of amide bond formed between a carboxyl group of one amino acid and an amino group of another. An isopeptide bond is the linkage between the side chain amino or carboxyl group of one amino acid to the α-carboxyl, α-amino group, or the side chain of another amino acid. In a typical peptide bond, also known as eupeptide bond, the amide bond always forms between the α-carboxyl group of one amino acid and the α-amino group of the second amino acid. Isopeptide bonds are rarer than regular peptide bonds. Isopeptide bonds lead to branching in the primary sequence of a protein. Proteins formed from normal peptide bonds typically have a linear primary sequence.

Amide bonds, and thus isopeptide bonds, are stabilized by resonance (electron delocalization) between the carbonyl oxygen, the carbonyl carbon, and the nitrogen atom. The bond strength of an isopeptide bond is similar to that of a peptide due to the similar bonding type. The bond strength of a peptide bond is around 300 kJ/mol, or about 70 kcal/mol.

Amino acids such as lysine, glutamic acid, glutamine, aspartic acid, and asparagine can form isopeptide bonds because they all contain an amino or carboxyl group on their side chain. For example, the formation of an isopeptide bond between the sidechains of lysine and glutamine is as follows:

- Gln−(C=O)NH_{2} + Lys-NH_{3}^{+} → Gln−(C=O)NH−Lys + NH_{4}^{+}

The ε-amino group of lysine can also react with the α-carboxyl group of any other amino acid as in the following reaction:

- Ile-(C=O)O^{−} + Lys-NH_{3}^{+} → Ile-(C=O)NH-Lys + H_{2}O

Isopeptide bond formation is typically enzyme-catalyzed. The reaction between lysine and glutamine, as shown above, is catalyzed by a transglutaminase. Another example of enzyme-catalyzed isopeptide bond formation is the formation of the glutathione molecule. Glutathione, a tripeptide, contains a normal peptide bond (between cysteine and glycine) and an isopeptide bond (between glutamate and cysteine). The formation of the isopeptide bond between the γ-carboxyl group of glutamate and the α-amino group of cysteine is catalyzed by the enzyme γ-glutamylcysteine synthetase. The isopeptide bond is formed instead of a eupeptide bond because intracellular peptidases are unable to recognize this linkage and therefore do not hydrolyze the bond. An isopeptide bond can form spontaneously as observed in the maturation of the bacteriophage HK97 capsid. In this case, the ε-amino group of lysine autocatalytically reacts with the side chain carboxamide group of asparagine. Spontaneous isopeptide bond formation between lysine and asparagine also occurs in Gram-positive bacterial pili.

== Function ==
Enzyme-generated isopeptide bonds have two main biological purposes: signaling and structure.

Biosignaling influences protein function, chromatin condensation, and protein-half life. The biostructural roles of isopeptide bonds include blood clotting (for wound healing), extracellular matrix upkeep, the apoptosis pathway, modifying micro-tubules, and forming pathogenic pili in bacteria. Isopeptide bonds contribute to the pathogenicity of Vibrio cholerae because the actin cross-linking domain (ACD) forms an intermolecular bond between the γ-carboxyl group of glutamate and the ε-amino group of lysine in actin. This process stops actin polymerization in the host cell.

=== Biosignaling ===
For isopeptide bonds linking one protein to another for the purpose of signal transduction, the literature is dominated by ubiquitin and other similar proteins. Ubiquitin and its related proteins (SUMO, Atg8, Atg12, etc.) all tend to follow relatively the same protein ligation pathway.

The process of protein ligation by ubiquitin and ubiquitin-like proteins has three main steps. In the initial step, the specific activating protein (E1 or E1-like protein) activates Ubiquitin by adenylating it with ATP. Then the adenylated Ubiquitin can be transferred to a conserved cysteine using a thioester bond which is between the carboxyl group of the C-terminal glycine of the ubiquitin and the sulfur of the E1 cysteine. The activating E1 enzyme then binds with and transfers the Ubiquitin to the next tier, the E2 enzyme which accepts the protein and once again forms a thioester with a conserved bond. The E2 acts to certain degree as an intermediary which then binds to E3 enzyme ligase for the final tier, which leads to the eventual transfer of the ubiquitin or ubiquitin related protein to a lysine site on the targeted protein, or more commonly for ubiquitin, onto ubiquitin itself to form chains of said protein.

However, in final tier, there is also a divergence, in that depending on the type of E3 ligase, it may not actually be causing the conjugation. As there are the E3 ligases containing HECT domains, in which they continue this 'transfer chain' by accepting once again the ubiquitin via another conserved cysteine and then targeting it and transferring it to the desired target. Yet in case of RING finger domain containing that use coordination bonds with Zinc ions to stabilize their structures, they act more to direct the reaction. By that, it's meant that once the RING finger E3 ligase binds with the E2 containing the ubiquitin, it simply acts as a targeting device which directs the E2 to directly ligate the target protein at the lysine site.

Though in this case ubiquitin does represent other proteins related to it well, each protein obviously will have its own nuisances such as SUMO, which tends to be RING finger domain ligases, where the E3 simply acts as the targeting device to direct the ligation by the E2, and not actually performing the reaction itself such as the Ubiquitin E3-HECT ligases. Thus while the internal mechanisms differ such as how proteins participate in the transfer chain, the general chemical aspects such as using thioesters and specific ligases for targeting remain the same.

=== Biostructural ===
The enzymatic chemistry involved in the formation of isopeptides for structural purposes is different from the case of ubiquitin and ubiquitin related proteins. In that, instead of sequential steps involving multiple enzymes to activate, conjugate and target the substrate. The catalysis is performed by one enzyme and the only precursor step, if there is one, is generally cleavage to activate it from a zymogen. However, the uniformity that exists in the ubiquitin's case is not so here, as there are numerous different enzymes all performing the reaction of forming the isopeptide bond.

The first case is that of the sortases, an enzyme family that is spread throughout numerous gram positive bacteria. It has been shown to be an important pathogenicity and virulence factor. The general reaction performed by sortases involves using its own brand of the 'catalytic triad': i.e. using histidine, arginine, and cysteine for the reactive mechanism. His and Arg act to help create the reactive environment, and Cys once again acts as the reaction center by using a thioester help hold a carboxyl group until the amine of a Lysine can perform a nucleophilic attack to transfer the protein and form the isopeptide bond. An ion that can sometimes play an important although indirect role in the enzymatic reaction is calcium, which is bound by sortase. It plays an important role in holding the structure of the enzyme in the optimal conformation for catalysis. However, there are cases where calcium has been shown to be non-essential for catalysis to take place.

Another aspect that distinguishes sortases in general is that they have a very specific targeting for their substrate, as sortases have generally two functions, the first is the fusing of proteins to the cell wall of the bacteria and the second is the polymerization of pilin. For the process of localization of proteins to the cell wall there is three-fold requirement that the protein contain a hydrophobic domain, a positively charged tail region, and final specific sequence used for recognition. The best studied of these signals is the LPXTG, which acts as the point of cleavage, where the sortase attacks in between Thr and Gly, conjugating to the Thr carboxyl group. Then the thioester is resolved by the transfer of the peptide to a primary amine, and this generally has a very high specificity, which is seen in the example of B. cereus where the sortase D enzyme helps to polymerize the BcpA protein via two recognition signals, the LPXTG as the cleavage and thioester forming point, and the YPKN site which acts as the recognition signal as where the isopeptide will form. While the particulars may vary between bacteria, the fundamentals of sortase enzymatic chemistry remain the same.

The next case is that of Transglutaminases (TGases), which act mainly within eukaryotes for fusing together different proteins for a variety of reasons such as a wound healing or attaching proteins to lipid membranes. The TGases themselves also contain their own 'catalytic triad' with Histidine, Aspartate, and Cysteine. The roles of these residues are analogous or the same as the previously described Sortases, in that His and Asp play a supporting role in interacting with the target residue, while the Cys forms a thioester with a carboxyl group for a later nucleophilic attack by a primary amine, in this case due to interest that of Lysine. Though the similarities to sortase catalytically start to end there, as the enzyme and the family is dependent on calcium, which plays a crucial structural role in holding a tight conformation of the enzyme. The TGases, also have a very different substrate specificity in that they target specifically the middle Gln, in the sequence 'Gln-Gln-Val'. The general substrate specificity, i.e. the specific protein is due to the general structure of different TGases which targets them to the substrate.

The specificity has been noted in TGases such that different TGases will react with different Gln's on the same protein, signifying that the enzymes have a very specific initial targeting. It has also been shown to have some specificity as to which target Lysine it transfers the protein to, as in the case of Factor XIII, where the adjacent residue to the Lys decides whether the reaction will occur. Thus while the TGases may initially seem like a eukaryotic sortase, they stand on their own as separate set of enzymes.

Another case of an isopeptide linking enzyme for structural purposes is the actin cross-linking domain (ACD) of the MARTX toxin protein generated by V. cholerae. While it has been shown that the ACD when performing the catalysis uses magnesium and ATP for the formation of the cross-links the specifics of the mechanism are uncertain. Though an interesting aspect of the cross-link formed in this case, is that it uses a non-terminal Glu to ligate to a non-terminal Lys, which seems to be rare in the process of forming an isopeptide bond. Though the chemistry of ACD is still to be resolved, it shows that isopeptide bond formation is not dependent simply on Asp/Asn for non-terminal isopeptide linkages between proteins.

The final case to be looked is the curious case of the post translational modifications of microtubilin (MT). MT contains a wide array of post translational modifications; however the two of most regarded interest are polyglutamylation and polyglycylation. Both modifications are similar in the sense they are repeating stretches of the same amino acid fused to the side chain carboxyl group of glutamate at the c-terminal region of the MT. The enzymatic mechanisms are not fully fleshed out as not much is known about the polyglycating enzyme. In the case of polyglutamylation the exact mechanism is also unknown, but it does seem to be ATP-dependent. Though again there is a lack of clarity in regard to the enzymatic chemistry, there is still valuable insight in the formation of isopeptide bonds using the R-group carboxyl of Glu in conjunction with the N-terminal amino of the modifying peptides.

== Applications ==
Spontaneous isopeptide bond formation has been exploited in the development a peptide tag called SpyTag. SpyTag can spontaneously and irreversibly react with its binding partner (a protein termed SpyCatcher) through a covalent isopeptide bond. This molecular tool may have applications for in vivo protein targeting, fluorescent microscopy, and irreversible attachment for a protein microarray. Following this, other Tag/Catcher systems were developed such as SnoopTag/SnoopCatcher and SdyTag/SdyCatcher that complement SpyTag/SpyCatcher.

== See also ==
- Organic Chemistry
- Biochemistry
- Protein tags
- SpyCatcher
