= TimeSTAMP protein labelling =

Protein labelling technique

TimeSTAMP (Time – Specific Tag for the Age Measurement of Proteins) is a technique invented by Michael Z. Lin at the Roger Tsien lab at the University of California, San Diego in 2008. It is a technique that can specifically label the newly synthesized copies of the genetically tagged protein.

== Principle of the TimeSTAMP technique ==
The TimeSTAMP technique for labelling newly synthesized proteins of interest and is based on drug–dependent preservation of epitope tags

In this technique, a tag that is present on all the proteins that are synthesized after the one-time administration of a small molecule drug. To achieve this goal, specific protease activity is incorporated to confer self–removing behaviour onto an epitope tag. Then, a corresponding protease inhibitor is used in order to block the removal of the tag. As a result, only those proteins synthesized after the application of inhibitor would be tagged.

A subsequent variant of TimeSTAMP allows for drug-dependent preservation of fluorescent protein tags.

== Application of TimeSTAMP technique ==
As TimeSTAMP technique can achieve temporally controlled labelling of newly synthesized proteins of interest even in thick tissues or intact animals and provide a sensitive, specific detection, the distribution of newly synthesized protein in a living animal can be studied
