= S-tag =

S-tag is the name of an oligopeptide derived from pancreatic ribonuclease A (RNase A).

If RNase A is digested with subtilisin, a single peptide bond is cleaved, but the resulting two products remain weakly bound to each other and the protein, called ribonuclease S, remains active although each of the two products alone shows no enzymatic activity. The N-terminus of the original RNase A, also called S-peptide, consists of 20 amino acid residues, of which only the first 15 are required for ribonuclease activity. This 15 amino acids long peptide is called S15 or S-tag.

The amino acid sequence of the S-tag is: Lys-Glu-Thr-Ala-Ala-Ala-Lys-Phe-Glu-Arg-Gln-His-Met-Asp-Ser. It is believed that the peptide with its abundance of charged and polar residues could improve solubility of proteins it is attached to. Moreover, the peptide alone is thought not to fold into a distinct structure. On DNA-level the S-tag can be attached to the N- or C-terminus of any protein. After gene expression, such a tagged protein can be detected by commercially available antibodies.
