= Fusion protein =

Protein created by joining other proteins into a single polypeptide

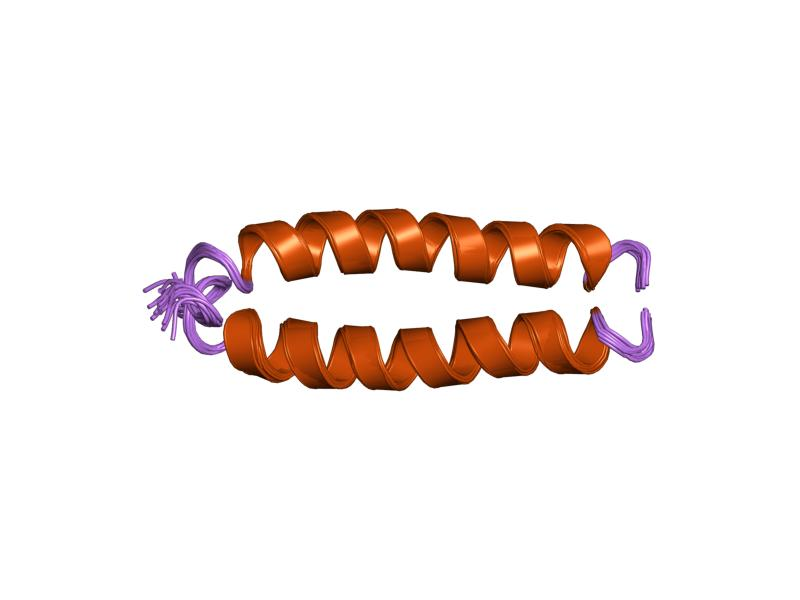
A chimeric protein including two subunits and a linker protein synthesized via recombinant fusion technology

Fusion proteins or chimeric proteins (literally, made of parts from different sources) are proteins created through the joining of two or more genes that originally coded for separate proteins. Translation of this fusion gene results in a single or multiple polypeptides with functional properties derived from each of the original proteins. Recombinant fusion proteins are created artificially by recombinant DNA technology for use in biological research or therapeutics. Chimeric or chimera usually designate hybrid proteins made of polypeptides having different functions or physico-chemical patterns. Chimeric mutant proteins occur naturally when a complex mutation, such as a chromosomal translocation, tandem duplication, or retrotransposition creates a novel coding sequence containing parts of the coding sequences from two different genes. Naturally occurring fusion proteins are commonly found in cancer cells, where they may function as oncoproteins. The bcr-abl fusion protein is a well-known example of an oncogenic fusion protein, and is considered to be the primary oncogenic driver of chronic myelogenous leukemia.

In the International nonproprietary name scheme, drugs based on fusion proteins are given the -fusp suffix.

== Functions ==
Some fusion proteins combine whole peptides and therefore contain all functional domains of the original proteins. However, other fusion proteins, especially those that occur naturally, combine only portions of coding sequences and therefore do not maintain the original functions of the parental genes that formed them.

Many whole gene fusions are fully functional and can still act to replace the original peptides. Some, however, experience interactions between the two proteins that can modify their functions. Beyond these effects, some gene fusions may cause regulatory changes that alter when and where these genes act. For partial gene fusions, the shuffling of different active sites and binding domains have the potential to result in new proteins with novel functions.

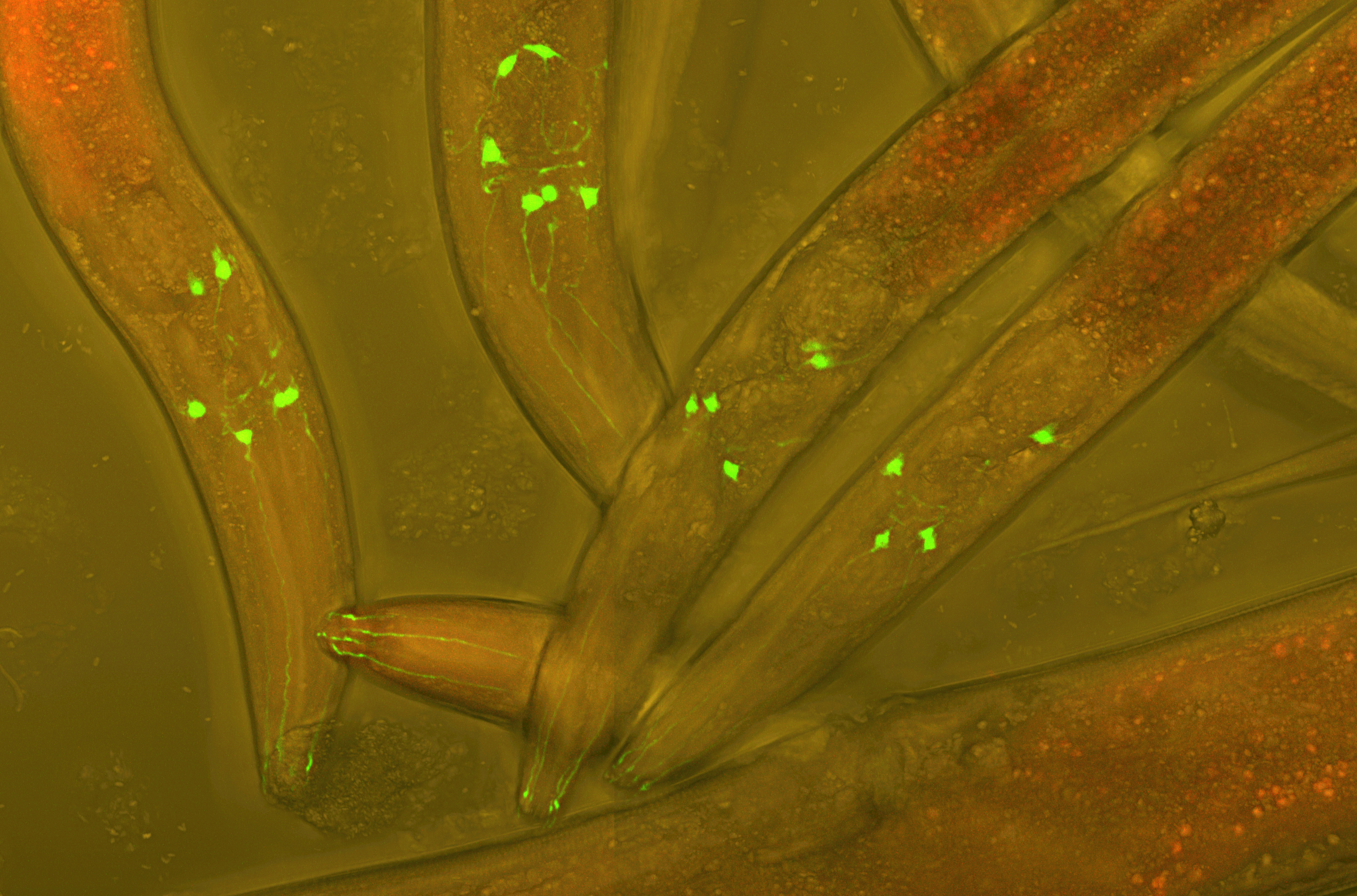
Green fluorescent protein (GFP) inserted into the neurons of Caenorhabditis elegans worms to track neuronal development

=== Fluorescent protein tags ===
The fusion of fluorescent tags to proteins in a host cell is a widely popular technique used in experimental cell and biology research in order to track protein interactions in real time. The first fluorescent tag, green fluorescent protein (GFP), was isolated from Aequorea victoria and is still used frequently in modern research. More recent derivations include photoconvertible fluorescent proteins (PCFPs), which were first isolated from Anthozoa. The most commonly used PCFP is the Kaede fluorescent tag, but the development of Kikume green-red (KikGR) in 2005 offers a brighter signal and more efficient photoconversion. The advantage of using PCFP fluorescent tags is the ability to track the interaction of overlapping biochemical pathways in real time. The tag will change color from green to red once the protein reaches a point of interest in the pathway, and the alternate colored protein can be monitored through the duration of pathway. This technique is especially useful when studying G-protein coupled receptor (GPCR) recycling pathways. The fates of recycled G-protein receptors may either be sent to the plasma membrane to be recycled, marked by a green fluorescent tag, or may be sent to a lysosome for degradation, marked by a red fluorescent tag.

=== Chimeric protein drugs ===
Sketches of mouse (top-left), chimeric (top-right) and humanized (bottom-left) monoclonal antibodies. Human parts are shown in brown, and non-human parts in blue.

The purpose of creating fusion proteins in drug development is to impart properties from each of the "parent" proteins to the resulting chimeric protein. Several chimeric protein drugs are currently available for medical use.

Many chimeric protein drugs are monoclonal antibodies whose specificity for a target molecule was developed using mice and hence were initially "mouse" antibodies. As non-human proteins, mouse antibodies tend to evoke an immune reaction if administered to humans. The chimerization process involves engineering the replacement of segments of the antibody molecule that distinguish it from a human antibody. For example, human constant domains can be introduced, thereby eliminating most of the potentially immunogenic portions of the drug without altering its specificity for the intended therapeutic target. Antibody nomenclature indicates this type of modification by inserting -xi- into the non-proprietary name (e.g., abci-xi-mab). If parts of the variable domains are also replaced by human portions, humanized antibodies are obtained. Although not conceptually distinct from chimeras, this type is indicated using -zu- such as in dacli-zu-mab. See the list of monoclonal antibodies for more examples.

In addition to chimeric and humanized antibodies, there are other pharmaceutical purposes for the creation of chimeric constructs. Etanercept, for example, is a TNFα blocker created through the combination of a tumor necrosis factor receptor (TNFR) with the immunoglobulin G1 Fc segment. TNFR provides specificity for the drug target and the antibody Fc segment is believed to add stability and deliverability of the drug. Additional chimeric proteins used for therapeutic applications include:

- Aflibercept: A human recombinant protein that aids in the treatment of oxaliplatin-resistant metastatic colorectal cancer, neo-vascular macular degeneration, and macular edema.
- Rilonacept: Reduces inflammation by preventing activation of IL-1 receptors to treat cryopyrin-associated periodic syndromes (CAPS).
- Alefacept: Regulated T-cell responses by selectively targeting effector memory T-cells to treat psoriasis vulgaris.
- Romiplostim: A peptibody that treats immune thrombocytopenia.
- Abatacept/Belatacept: Interferes with T-cell co-stimulation to treat autoimmune disorders like rheumatoid arthritis, psoriatic arthritis, and psoriasis.
- Denileukin-diftitox: Treats cutaneous lymphoma.

== Recombinant technology ==
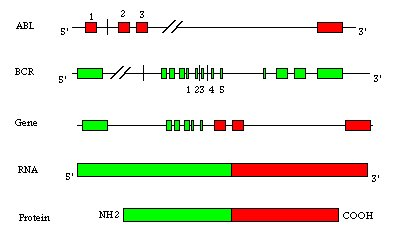
Fusion of two genes (BCR-ABL) to encode a recombinant oncogenic protein

A recombinant fusion protein is a protein created through genetic engineering of a fusion gene. This typically involves removing the stop codon from a cDNA sequence coding for the first protein, then appending the cDNA sequence of the second protein in frame through ligation or overlap extension PCR. That DNA sequence will then be expressed by a cell as a single protein. The protein can be engineered to include the full sequence of both original proteins, or only a portion of either.

If the two entities are proteins, often linker (or "spacer") peptides are also added, which make it more likely that the proteins fold independently and behave as expected. Especially in the case where the linkers enable protein purification, linkers in protein or peptide fusions are sometimes engineered with cleavage sites for proteases or chemical agents that enable the liberation of the two separate proteins. This technique is often used for identification and purification of proteins, by fusing a GST protein, FLAG peptide, or a hexa-his peptide (6xHis-tag), which can be isolated using affinity chromatography with nickel or cobalt resins. Di- or multimeric chimeric proteins can be manufactured through genetic engineering by fusion to the original proteins of peptide domains that induce artificial protein di- or multimerization (e.g., streptavidin or leucine zippers). Fusion proteins can also be manufactured with toxins or antibodies attached to them in order to study disease development. Hydrogenase promoter, P_{SH}, was studied constructing a P_{SH} promoter-gfp fusion by using green fluorescent protein (gfp) reporter gene.

=== Recombinant functionality ===
Novel recombinant technologies have made it possible to improve fusion protein design for use in fields as diverse as biodetection, paper and food industries, and biopharmaceuticals. Recent improvements have involved the fusion of single peptides or protein fragments to regions of existing proteins, such as N and C termini, and are known to increase the following properties:

- Catalytic efficiency: Fusion of certain peptides allow for greater catalytic efficiency by altering the tertiary and quaternary structure of the target protein.
- Solubility: A common challenge in fusion protein design is the issue of insolubility of newly synthesized fusion proteins in the recombinant host, leading to an over-aggregation of the target protein in the cell. Molecular chaperones that are able to aid in protein folding may be added, thereby better segregating hydrophobic and hydrophilic interactions in the solute to increase protein solubility.
- Thermostability: Singular peptides or protein fragments are typically added to reduce flexibility of either the N or C terminus of the target protein, which reinforces thermostability and stabilizes pH range.
- Enzyme activity: Fusion that involves the introduction of hydrogen bonds may be used to expand overall enzyme activity.
- Expression levels: Addition of numerous fusion fragments, such as maltose binding protein (MBP) or small ubiquitin-like molecule (SUMO), serve to enhance enzyme expression and secretion of the target protein.
- Immobilization: PHA synthase, an enzyme that allows for the immobilization of proteins of interest, is an important fusion tag in industrial research.
- Crystal quality: Crystal quality can be improved by adding covalent links between proteins, aiding in structure determination techniques.

== Recombinant protein design ==
The earliest applications of recombinant protein design can be documented in the use of single peptide tags for purification of proteins in affinity chromatography. Since then, a variety of fusion protein design techniques have been developed for applications as diverse as fluorescent protein tags to recombinant fusion protein drugs. Three commonly used design techniques include tandem fusion, domain insertion, and post-translational conjugation.

=== Tandem fusion ===
The proteins of interest are simply connected end-to-end via fusion of N or C termini between the proteins. This provides a flexible bridge structure allowing enough space between fusion partners to ensure proper folding. However, the N or C termini of the peptide are often crucial components in obtaining the desired folding pattern for the recombinant protein, making simple end-to-end conjoining of domains ineffective in this case. For this reason, a protein linker is often needed to maintain the functionality of the protein domains of interest.

=== Domain insertion ===
This technique involves the fusion of consecutive protein domains by encoding desired structures into a single polypeptide chain, but sometimes may require insertion of a domain within another domain. This technique is typically regarding as more difficult to carry out than tandem fusion, due to difficulty finding an appropriate ligation site in the gene of interest.

=== Post-translational conjugation ===
This technique fuses protein domains following ribosomal translation of the proteins of interest, in contrast to genetic fusion prior to translation used in other recombinant technologies.

=== Protein linkers ===
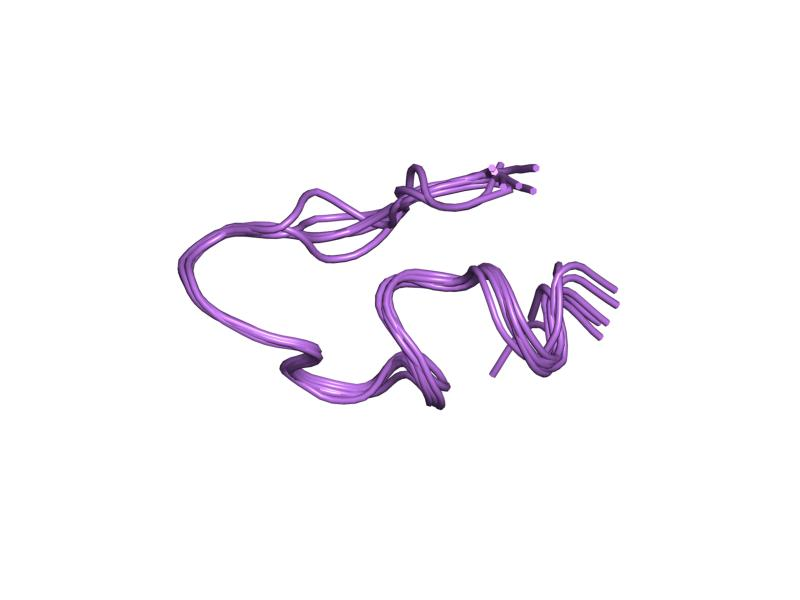
A protein used as a linker in fusion protein design

Protein linkers aid fusion protein design by providing appropriate spacing between domains, supporting correct protein folding in the case that N or C termini interactions are crucial to folding. Commonly, protein linkers permit important domain interactions, reinforce stability, and reduce steric hindrance, making them preferred for use in fusion protein design even when N and C termini can be fused. Three major types of linkers are flexible, rigid, and in vivo cleavable.

- Flexible linkers may consist of many small glycine residues, giving them the ability curl into a dynamic, adaptable shape.
- Rigid linkers may be formed of large, cyclic proline residues, which can be helpful when highly specific spacing between domains must be maintained.
- In vivo cleavable linkers are unique in that they are designed to allow the release of one or more fused domains under certain reaction conditions, such as a specific pH gradient, or when coming in contact with another biomolecule in the cell.

== Natural occurrence ==
Naturally occurring fusion genes are most commonly created when a chromosomal translocation replaces the terminal exons of one gene with intact exons from a second gene. This creates a single gene that can be transcribed, spliced, and translated to produce a functional fusion protein. Many important cancer-promoting oncogenes are fusion genes produced in this way.

Examples include:

- Gag-onc fusion protein
- Bcr-abl fusion protein
- Tpr-met fusion protein

Antibodies are fusion proteins produced by V(D)J recombination.

There are also rare examples of naturally occurring polypeptides that appear to be a fusion of two clearly defined modules, in which each module displays its characteristic activity or function, independent of the other. Two major examples are: double PP2C chimera in Plasmodium falciparum (the malaria parasite), in which each PP2C module exhibits protein phosphatase 2C enzymatic activity, and the dual-family immunophilins that occur in a number of unicellular organisms (such as protozoan parasites and Flavobacteria) and contain full-length cyclophilin and FKBP chaperone modules. The evolutionary origin of such chimera remains unclear.

== See also ==
- Genetic engineering
- Protein engineering
- Cell–cell fusogens
