= Iranian Center for Translation Studies =

Iranian research center

Research Institute for Translation Studies
- Type: Research Institution
- Established: 2005
- Director: Dr. Fatemeh Parham
- Location: Tehran, Iran
- Website: []

Research Institute for Translation Studies or RITS (Persian: پژوهشکده مطالعات ترجمه) is an Iranian research center working in affiliation with Allameh Tabataba'i University in order to initiate a translation movement and upgrade the status of translation in Iran.

Translation movement in Iran, as the main orientation of this center, is defined as rationale and measured selection of fundamental books in various fields, providing appropriate grounds for research pertaining to translation as well as training professional translators.

Among the most important activities of Iranian Center for Translation Studies are:

- Training specialized translators
- Preparing translation resource databases
- Publishing professional glossaries
- Translation of fundamental texts

== See also ==
- Translation studies
