= World Court (disambiguation) =

The World Court, or the International Court of Justice (ICJ), is a UN court that settles disputes between nations.

World Court may also refer to:

== Judicial courts ==
- International Criminal Court (ICC), a court in The Hague that prosecutes individuals for crimes against humanity and similar atrocities
- Permanent Court of Arbitration (PCA), in The Hague
- Permanent Court of International Justice (PCIJ; 1922–1946), an international court attached to the League of Nations
- any international court

== Tennis court ==
- Pro Tennis: World Court, a tennis arcade game

== See also ==
- Court of Arbitration for Sport organization established to settle international sports disputes through arbitration.
- Peace Palace, courthouse for the International Court of Justice, Permanent Court of Arbitration, and Permanent Court of International Justice
- The Hague, international courts based in the city are commonly referred to as the World Court
- World Courts of Women
