= FlAsH-EDT2 =

Names
- Other names Fluorescein Arsenical Hairpin Binder; Lumio green

Identifiers
CAS Number	212118-77-9
3D model (JSmol)	Interactive image; Interactive image
ChEBI	CHEBI:52107
ChEMBL	ChEMBL454668
ChemSpider	2043798
PubChem CID	2763100
UNII	Z8CH38Y9L3
CompTox Dashboard (EPA)	DTXSID90431400
- InChI: InChI=1S/C24H18As2O5S4/c27-17-7-5-15-19(13-3-1-2-4-14(13)24(29)30)16-6-8-18(28)21(26-34-11-12-35-26)23(16)31-22(15)20(17)25-32-9-10-33-25/h1-8,27H,9-12H2,(H,29,30) Key: KCPRYVGBEBFLIG-UHFFFAOYSA-N
- SMILES: c1ccc(c(c1)c2c3ccc(c(c3oc-4c(c(=O)ccc24)[As]5SCCS5)[As]6SCCS6)O)C(=O)O; OC(=O)C1=C(C=CC=C1)C1=C2C=CC(=O)C([As]3SCCS3)=C2OC2=C([As]3SCCS3)C(O)=CC=C12

Properties
Chemical formula	C_{24}H_{18}As_{2}O_{5}S_{4}
Molar mass	664.49 g·mol^{−1}
Appearance	Solid
Melting point	169 to 172 °C (336 to 342 °F; 442 to 445 K)
- Except where otherwise noted, data are given for materials in their standard state (at 25 °C [77 °F], 100 kPa). Infobox references

FlAsH-EDT_{2} is an organoarsenic compound with molecular formula C_{24}H_{18}As_{2}O_{5}S_{4}. Its structure is based around a fluorescein core with two 1,3,2-dithiarsolane substituents. It is used in bioanalytical research as a fluorescent label for visualising proteins in living cells. FlAsH-EDT_{2} is an abbreviation for fluorescin arsenical hairpin binder-ethanedithiol, and is a pale yellow or pinkish fluorogenic solid. It has a semi-structural formula (C_{2}H_{4}AsS_{2})_{2}-(C_{13}H_{5}O_{3})-C_{6}H_{4}COOH, representing the dithiarsolane substituents bound to the hydroxyxanthone core, attached to an o-substituted molecule of benzoic acid.

FlAsH-EDT_{2} is used for site-specific labelling, selectively binding to proteins containing the tetracysteine (TC) motif Cys-Cys-Xxx-Xxx-Cys-Cys and becoming fluorescent when bound. It displays non-specific binding to endogenous cysteine-rich proteins, meaning it binds to sites other than the one of interest (CCXXCC). Further optimization of the TC motif has revealed improved FlAsH binding affinity for a CCPGCC motif, and higher quantum yield when the tetracysteine motif is flanked with specific residues (HRWCCPGCCKTF or FLNCCPGCCMEP).

== Preparation ==
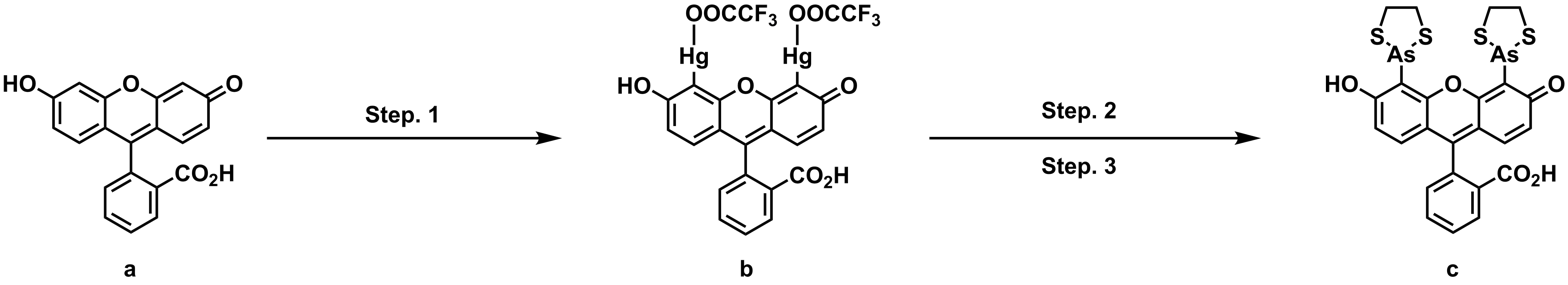
Step 1: HgO in TFA; Step 2: AsCl_{3}, followed by Pd(OAc)_{2} and DIEA; Step 3: H_{2}EDT in aqueous acetone.

FlAsH-EDT_{2} can be prepared in three steps from fluorescein (see figure).

== Formation of FlAsH-TC adduct ==
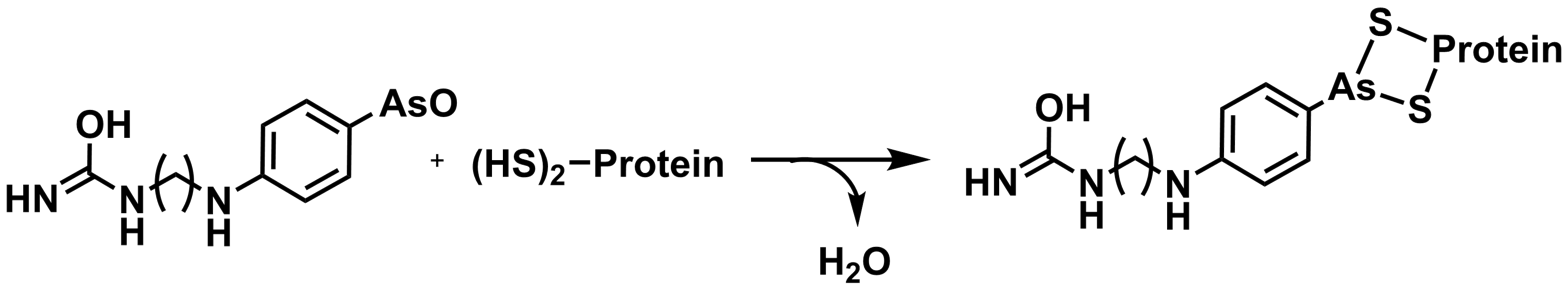

Many studies show that trivalent arsenic compounds bind to pairs of cysteine residues. This binding is responsible for the toxicity of many arsenic compounds. Binding is reversed by 1,2-ethanedithiol, which binds tightly to arsenic compounds, as shown by the stability of FlAsH-EDT_{2}. Such strong sulfur-arsenic bond can be, again, regulated by designing a peptide domain that exhibits higher affinity toward the arsenic, such as tetracysteine motif. By modulating the distance between the two pairs of cysteine residues and the space between the arsenic centers of FlAsH-EDT_{2}, a cooperative and entropically favored dithiol arsenic bond could be achieved.

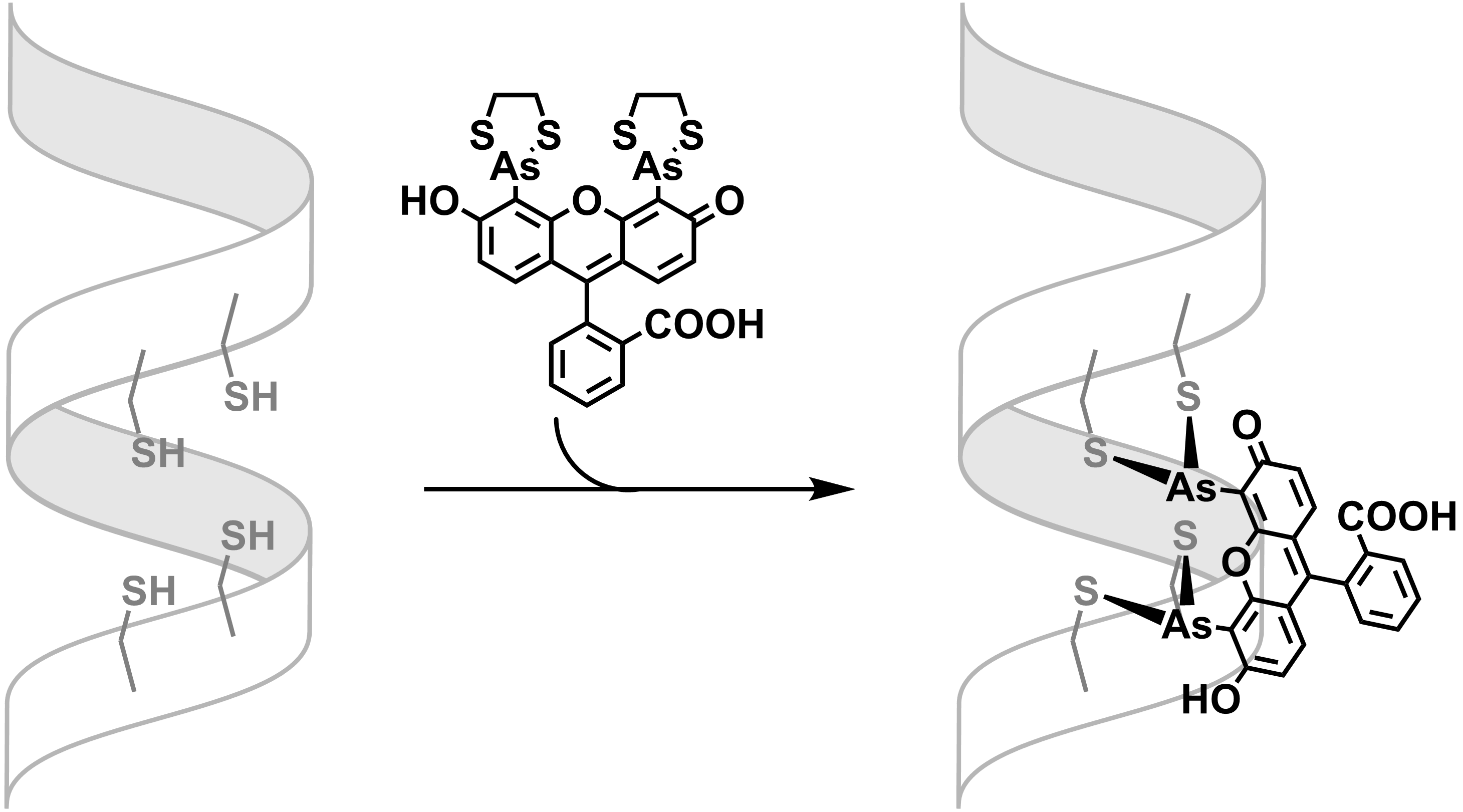
Formation of FlAsH-TC adduct

The binding of FlAsH-EDT_{2} is thus subject to equilibration. The FlAsH-peptide adduct formation can be favored in low concentration of EDT (below 10 μM) and be reversed in high concentration of EDT (above 1 mM).

== Properties ==
FlAsH becomes fluorescent upon the binding of tetracysteine motif. It is excited at 508 nm and emits 528 nm, a green-yellow, of free fluorescein. The quantum yield is 0.49 for 250 nM FlAsH is bound to a model tetracysteine-containing peptide in a phosphate-buffered saline at pH 7.4.

Generally, FlAsH-EDT_{2} has 0.1-0.6 fluorescence quantum efficiencies with several μM detection limits for diffuse cytosolic tag and 30 - 80 extinction coefficients L mmol^{−1} cm^{−1}. The FlAsH-peptide complex also has demonstrated fluorescence resonance energy transfer (FRET) from fluorescent proteins, such as from enhanced cyan fluorescent protein (ECFP) of Green Fluorescent Protein (GFP).

== Application ==
FlAsH-EDT_{2} enables less toxic and more specific fluorescent labeling that is membrane permeable. The modification of the fluorescein moiety also allows multicolor analysis. It has been proven to be a good alternative to green fluorescent proteins (GFP) with the advantage that FlAsH-EDT_{2} is much smaller (molar mass < 1 kDa) as compared to GFPs (~30 kDa), therefore minimizing the perturbation of activity of the protein under the study.

=== Use ===
In the past, FlAsH-EDT_{2} has been widely used to study a number of in vivo cellular events and subcellular structures in animal cells, Ebola virus matrix protein, and protein misfolding. With the electron microscopic imaging, FlAsH-EDT_{2} is also used to study the processes of protein trafficking in situ. More recently, it was used in an extended study of plant cells like Arabidopsis and tobacco.
