= His-tag =

Molecular biology technique

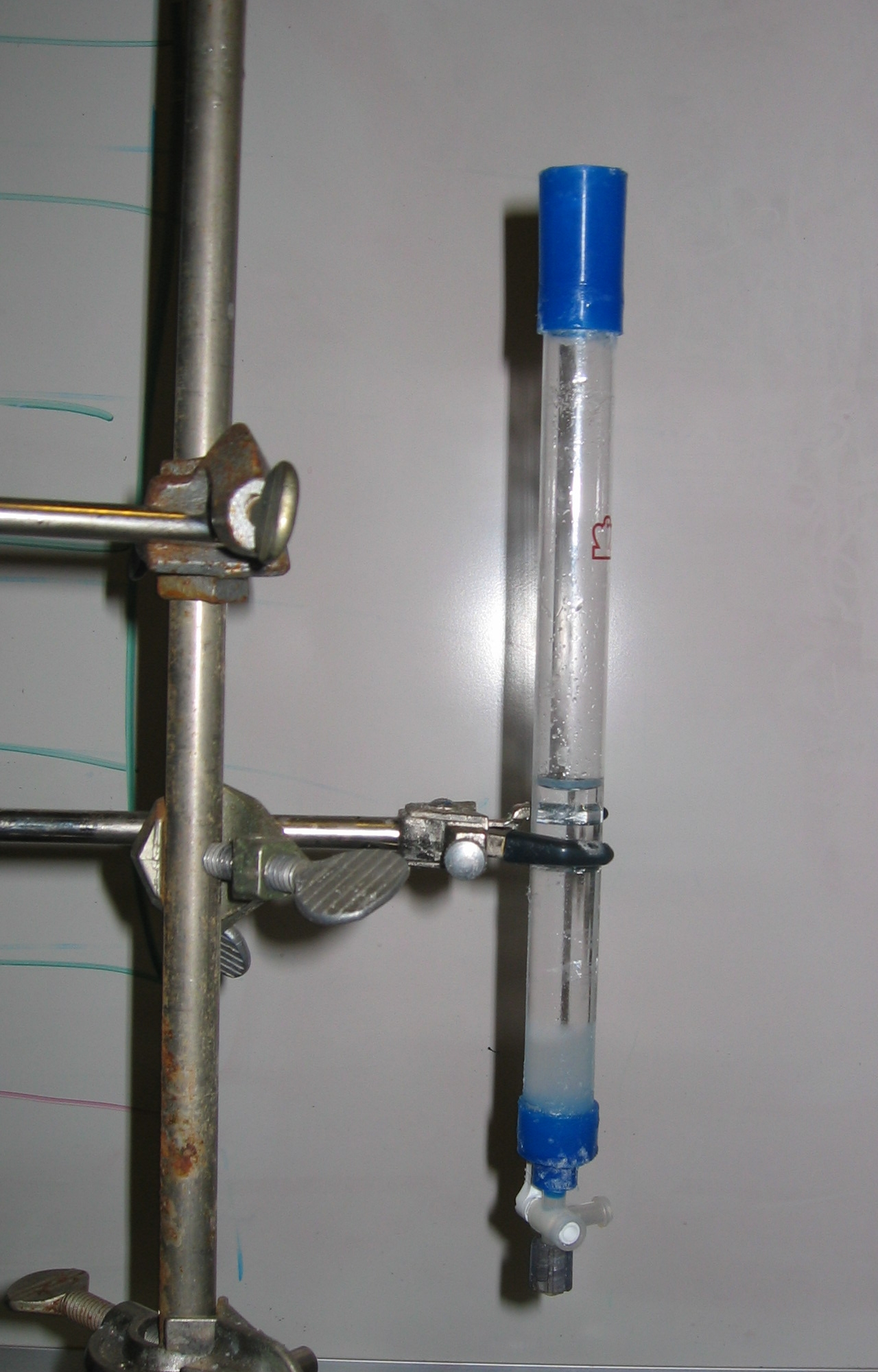
A simple gravity flow column for Ni^{2+}-affinity chromatography. The sample and subsequent buffers are manually poured into the column and collected at the bottom end after flowing through the resin bed (in light blue at the base of the column).

A polyhistidine-tag, best known by the trademarked name His-tag, is an amino acid motif in proteins that typically consists of at least six histidine (His) residues, often at the N- or C-terminus of the protein. It is also known as a hexa histidine-tag, 6xHis-tag, or His6 tag. The tag was invented by Roche, although the use of histidines and its vectors are distributed by Qiagen. Various purification kits for histidine-tagged proteins are commercially available from multiple companies.

The total number of histidine residues may vary in the tag from as low as two, to as high as 10 or more His residues. N- or C-terminal His-tags may also be followed or preceded, respectively, by a suitable amino acid sequence that facilitates removal of the polyhistidine-tag using endopeptidases. This extra sequence is not necessary if exopeptidases are used to remove N-terminal His-tags (e.g., Qiagen TAGZyme). Furthermore, exopeptidase cleavage may solve the unspecific cleavage observed when using endoprotease-based tag removal. Polyhistidine-tags are often used for affinity purification of genetically modified proteins.

== Principle ==
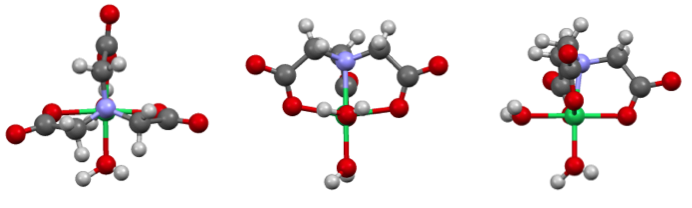
Three views of the X-ray structure of Ni(NTA)(H_{2}O)_{2}

Proteins can coordinate metal ions on their surface and it is possible to separate proteins using chromatography by making use of the difference in their affinity to metal ions. This is termed as immobilized metal ion affinity chromatography (IMAC), as originally introduced in 1975 under the name metal chelate affinity chromatography. Subsequent studies have revealed that among amino acids constituting proteins, histidine is strongly involved in the coordination complex with metal ions. Therefore, if a number of histidines are added to the end of the protein, the affinity of the protein for the metal ion is increased and this can be exploited to selectively isolate the protein of interest. When a protein with a His-tag is brought into contact with a carrier on which a metal ion such as nickel is immobilized, the histidine residue chelates the metal ion and binds to the carrier. Since other proteins do not bind to the carrier or bind only very weakly, they can be removed by washing the carrier with an appropriate buffer. The poly-histidine tagged protein can then be recovered by eluting it off the resin.

=== Practical choices ===
==== Tag length ====
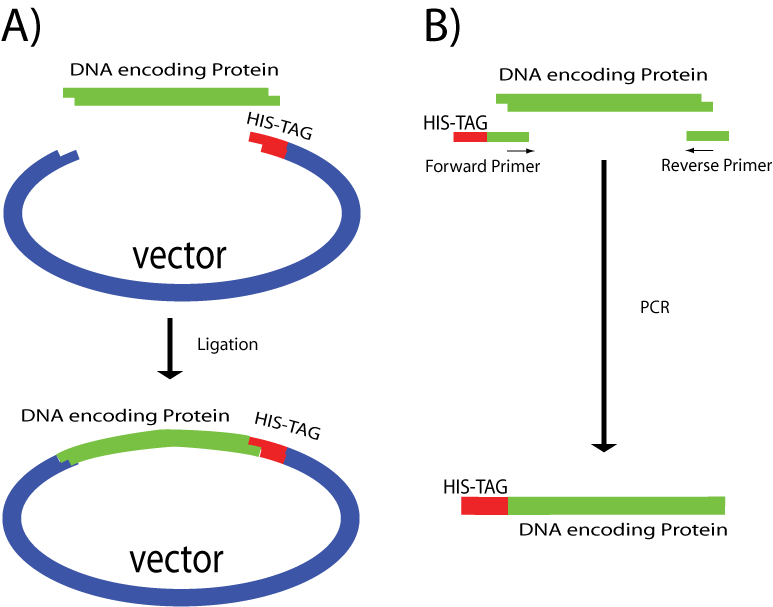
Examples of methods for adding polyhistidine tags. (A) The polyhistidine tag is added by inserting the DNA encoding a protein of interest in a vector that has the tag ready to fuse at the C-terminus. (B) The polyhistidine tag is added using primers containing the tag coding sequence as an overhang on the forward primer. After PCR amplification, the tag is present on the N-terminus of the gene, which can then be sub-cloned into an expression vector.

Polyhistidine tags most commonly consist of six histidine residues. Tags with up to twelve histidine residues or dual tags attached via short linker are not uncommon though and may improve purification results by enhancing binding to the affinity resin, allowing for increased stringency of washing and separation from endogenous proteins. The tag can be added to a gene of interest using methods common to most purification tags. The most basic method is to subclone the gene of interest into a vector containing a polyhistidine tag sequence. Many vectors for use with various expression systems are available with polyhistidine tags in a variety of positions and with differing protease cleavage sites, other tags etc. However, if an appropriate vector is unavailable or the tag needs to be inserted at a location other than the proteins N- or C-terminus, the gene of interest can be either directly synthesised containing a polyhistidine tag sequence or various methods based on PCR can be used to add the tag to a gene. A common approach is to add the coding sequence for the polyhistidine tag to the PCR primers as an overhang.

==== Tag position ====
Most commonly, a polyhistidine tag is fused at the N-terminus or C-terminus of a protein and is attached via a short flexible linker, which may contain a protease cleavage site. Less commonly, tags can be added at both the N- and C-termini or inserted at an intermediate part of a protein, such as within an exposed loop. The choice of tag position depends on the properties of each protein and the chosen purification strategy; it may be necessary to test multiple constructs with the tag at different positions. Although polyhistidine tags are considered to typically not alter the properties of a protein, it has been demonstrated that addition of the tag can cause unwanted effects, such as influencing the protein's oligomeric state.

==== Carrier matrices ====
Various carrier matrices bound to a solid resin support are on the market and these can be subsequently charged with a metal cation. Derivatives of iminodiacetic acid (IDA) and nitrilotriacetic acid (NTA) are most frequently used for this purpose, with differing matrices having certain advantages and disadvantages for various applications.

==== Metal ions ====
Several metal cations have high affinities for imidazole, the functional group of the His-tag. Divalent cation M^{2+} (M = Mn, Fe, Co, Ni, Cu, Zn etc) transition metal imidazole complexes are most frequently used for this purpose. The choice of cation is generally a compromise between binding capacity and purity. Nickel is often used as it offers a good balance between these factors, while cobalt can be used when it is desired to increase the purity of purification as it has less affinity for endogenous proteins; binding capacity however is lower compared with nickel.

==== Elution method ====
In order to elute His-tagged protein from the carrier there are several potential methods, which can be used in combination if necessary. In order to avoid denaturation of proteins, it is generally desirable to use as mild a method as possible.

- Competition with analogs

For releasing the His-tagged protein from the carrier, a compound is used that has a structure similar to the His-tag and which also forms a coordination complex with the immobilized metal ions. Such a compound added to the His-tagged protein on the carrier competes with the protein for the immobilized metal ions. The compound added at high concentration replaces virtually all carrier-bound protein which is thus eluted from the carrier. Imidazole is the side chain of histidine and is typically used at a concentration of 100 - 500 mM for elution. Histidine can also be used.

- Decrease in pH

When the pH decreases, the histidine residue is protonated and can no longer coordinate the metal tag, allowing the protein to be eluted. When nickel is used as the metal ion, it is eluted at around pH 4 and cobalt at around pH 6.

- Removal of metal ions

When a strong chelating agent such as EDTA is added, the protein is detached from the carrier because the metal ion immobilized on the carrier is lost.

== Applications ==
=== Protein purification ===
Polyhistidine-tags are often used for affinity purification of polyhistidine-tagged recombinant proteins expressed in Escherichia coli or other expression systems. Typically, cells are harvested via centrifugation and the resulting cell pellet lysed either by physical means or by means of detergents and enzymes such as lysozyme or any combination of these. At this stage, the lysate contains the recombinant protein among many endogenous proteins originating from the host cells. The lysate is exposed to affinity resin bound to a carrier matrix coupled with a divalent cation, either by direct addition of resin (batch binding) or by passing over a resin bed in a column format. The resin is then washed with buffer to remove proteins that do not specifically interact with bound cation and the protein of interest is eluted off the resin using buffer containing a high concentration of imidazole or a lowered pH. The purity and amount of protein can be assessed by methods such SDS-PAGE and Western blotting.

Affinity purification using a polyhistidine-tag usually results in relatively pure protein. Protein purity can be improved by the addition of a low (20-40 mM) concentration of imidazole to the binding and/or wash buffers. However, depending on the requirements of the downstream application, further purification steps using methods such as ion exchange or size exclusion chromatography may be required. IMAC resins typically retain several prominent endogenous proteins as impurities. In E. coli for instance, a prominent example is FKBP-type peptidyl prolyl isomerase, which appears around 25 kDa on SDS-PAGE. These impurities can be eliminated using additional purification steps or by expressing the recombinant protein in a deficient strain of cells. Alternatively, cobalt charged IMAC resins which have less affinity for endogenous proteins can be used.

=== Binding assays ===
Polyhistidine-tagging can be used to detect protein-protein interactions in the same way as a pull-down assay. Polyhistidine tagging has several advantages over other tags commonly used for pull-down assays, including its small size, high binding capacity of the resin, few naturally occurring proteins binding to the carrier matrices and the increased stability of the carrier matrix over monoclonal antibody matrices.

=== Fluorescent tags ===
Hexahistadine CyDye tags have been developed, which use nickel covalent coordination to EDTA groups attached to fluorophores in order to create dyes that attach to the polyhistidine tag. This technique has been shown to be useful for following protein migration and trafficking and may be effective for measuring distance via Förster resonance energy transfer.

=== Fluorohistidine tags ===
A polyfluorohistidine tag has been reported for use in in vitro translation systems. In this system, an expanded genetic code is used in which histidine is replaced by 4-fluorohistidine. The fluorinated analog is incorporated into peptides via the relaxed substrate specificity of histidine-tRNA ligase and lowers the overall pK_{a} of the tag. This allows for the selective enrichment of polyfluorohistidine tagged peptides in the presence of complex mixtures of traditional polyhistidine tags by altering the pH of the wash buffers.

== Detection ==
The polyhistidine-tag can also be used for detecting a protein via anti-polyhistidine-tag antibodies, which can be useful for subcellular localization, ELISA, western blotting and other immuno-analytical methods. Alternatively, in-gel staining of SDS-PAGE or native-PAGE gels with fluorescent probes bearing metal ions can be used for detection of a polyhistidine tagged protein.

== Similar tags ==
=== HQ tag ===
The HQ tag has alternating histidine and glutamine (HQHQHQ).

=== HN tag ===
The HN tag has alternating histidine and asparagine (HNHNHNHNHNHN) and is more likely to be presented on the protein surface than Histidine-only tags. The HN tag binds to the immobilized metal ion more efficiently than the His tag.

=== HAT tag ===
The HAT tag is a peptide tag (KDHLIHNVHKEEHAHAHNK) derived from chicken lactate dehydrogenase, and is more likely to be a soluble protein with no bias in charge distribution compared to the His tag. The arrangement of histidines in the HAT tag allows high accessibility compared to the His tag, and it binds efficiently to the immobilized metal ion.

== See also ==
- Protein tag
- Maltose-binding protein-tag
- SpyTag
- Glutathione S-transferase-tag
