= Antigen =

Molecule triggering an immune response

An illustration that shows how antigens induce the immune system response by interacting with an antibody that matches the molecular structure of an antigen

In immunology, an antigen (Ag) is a molecule, or portion there of, that can bind to a specific antibody or T-cell receptor. The presence of antigens in the body may trigger an immune response.

Antigens can be proteins, peptides (amino acid chains), polysaccharides (chains of simple sugars), lipids, or nucleic acids. Antigens exist on normal cells, cancer cells, parasites, viruses, fungi, and bacteria.

Antigens are recognized by antigen receptors, including antibodies and T-cell receptors. Diverse antigen receptors are made by cells of the immune system so that each cell has a specificity for a single antigen. Upon exposure to an antigen, only the lymphocytes that recognize that antigen are activated and expanded, a process known as clonal selection. In most cases, antibodies are antigen-specific, meaning that an antibody can only react to and bind one specific antigen; in some instances, however, antibodies may cross-react to bind more than one antigen. The reaction between an antigen and an antibody is called the antigen-antibody reaction.

Antigen can originate either from within the body ("self-protein" or "self antigens") or from the external environment ("non-self"). The immune system identifies and attacks "non-self" external antigens. Antibodies usually do not react with self-antigens due to negative selection of T cells in the thymus and B cells in the bone marrow. The diseases in which antibodies react with self antigens and damage the body's own cells are called autoimmune diseases.

Vaccines are examples of antigens in an immunogenic form, which are intentionally administered to a recipient to induce the memory function of the adaptive immune system towards antigens of the pathogen invading that recipient. The vaccine for seasonal influenza is a common example.

== Etymology ==
Paul Ehrlich coined the term antibody (German: Antikörper) in his side-chain theory at the end of the 19th century. In 1899, Ladislas Deutsch (László Detre) named the hypothetical substances halfway between bacterial constituents and antibodies "antigenic or immunogenic substances" (French: substances immunogènes ou antigènes). He originally believed those substances to be precursors of antibodies, just as a zymogen is a precursor of an enzyme. But, by 1903, he understood that an antigen induces the production of immune bodies (antibodies) and wrote that the word antigen is a contraction of antisomatogen (Immunkörperbildner). The Oxford English Dictionary indicates that the logical construction should be "anti(body)-gen". The term originally referred to a substance that acts as an antibody generator.

== Terminology ==
Antigens can be proteins, polysaccharides, lipids, nucleic acids or other biomolecules. This includes parts (coats, capsules, cell walls, flagella, fimbriae, and toxins) of bacteria, viruses, and other microorganisms. Non-microbial non-self antigens can include pollen, egg white, and proteins from transplanted tissues and organs or on the surface of transfused blood cells.

- Immunogen — an antigen that is capable of inducing an immune response, i.e., it is immunogenic. Antigen is often used interchangeably with this term, but this is not, strictly speaking, correct. All immunogens are antigens, but not all antigens are immunogens. The antigen within a vaccine is often referred to as an immunogen, even if, strictly speaking, its purified form cannot induce immune responses (requiring adjuvants to do so). For simplicity, many sources use the term "antigen" in place of "immunogen," but these terms should not be regarded as interchangeable.
- Allergen – A substance capable of causing an allergic reaction in sensitized individuals. The reaction may result after exposure via ingestion, inhalation, injection, or contact with skin.
- Tolerogen – A substance that invokes immune tolerance. This property is related to its molecular properties and circumstances such as route of administration.
- Superantigen – A class of antigens that cause non-specific activation of T-cells, resulting in polyclonal T-cell activation and massive cytokine release.
- Immunoglobulin-binding protein – Proteins such as protein A, protein G, and protein L that are capable of binding to antibodies at positions outside of the antigen-binding site (paratope). These are sometimes known as B cell superantigens.
- Epitope – The specific part of an antigen that is bound by an antibody (or T cell receptor), its antigenic determinant.
  Antigenic molecules, normally "large" biological polymers, usually present surface features that can act as points of interaction for specific antibodies. Any such feature constitutes an epitope. Most antigens have the potential to be bound by multiple antibodies, each of which is specific to one of the antigen's epitopes. Using the "lock and key" metaphor, the antigen can be seen as a string of keys (epitopes) each of which matches a different lock (antibody). Different antibody idiotypes, each have distinctly formed complementarity-determining regions. Antibodies may compete for binding when they recognize overlapping epitopes.
- Paratope — The specific part of the antibody that binds the antigen (in general, the complementarity-determining region, though sometimes framework regions may contribute).
- Agretope — The specific peptide sequence recognized by a major histocompatibility complex (MHC).
- Hapten — A small molecule that can only induce an immune response when attached to a larger carrier molecule, such as a protein. The hapten alone will not be recognized if not associated with a carrier.
- T-dependent antigen – Antigens that require the assistance of T cells to induce the formation of specific antibodies.
- T-independent antigen – Antigens that can induce the production of antibodies without the help of T cells.
  - T-independent type I antigen — Mitogens that induce nonspecific activation of B cells (at smaller doses, they initially appeared specific to particular B cells, suggesting erroneously that this was an antigen-specific process; subsequent investigation proved their nonspecific nature)
  - T-independent type II antigen — Antigens containing multiple repetitive motifs that allow them to crosslink B cell receptors and directly activate the B cells. Bacterial capsule polysaccharides are a common example.
- Immunodominant antigens – Antigens that dominate (over all others from a pathogen) in their ability to produce an immune response. T cell responses typically are directed against a relatively few immunodominant epitopes, although in some cases (e.g., infection with the malaria pathogen Plasmodium spp.) it is dispersed over a relatively large number of parasite antigens. These are contrasted with immunosubdominant (sometimes referred to just as "subdominant") antigens.

Antigen-presenting cells present antigens in the form of peptides on major histocompatibility complexes. All nucleated cells (i.e., all cells except for red blood cells) express MHC class I, which samples peptides from the cytosol, defaulting to presenting self-antigen (unless something foreign ends up in the cytosol or if the cell is capable of cross-presentation). Antigens originating from outside the cell make their way into the endomembrane system via processes like phagocytosis, endocytosis, or macropinocytosis and are loaded onto MHC class II molecules. In contrast to MHC class I, MHC class II is expressed on a limited subset of cells, the vast majority of which are immune cells (some epithelial cells at mucosal surfaces may also express MHC class II). Often, when people refer to antigen-presenting cells, they are actually referring to professional antigen-presenting cells. Professional antigen-presenting cells refer to B cells, dendritic cells, Langerhans cells, and macrophages, all of which express MHC class II and have the ability to activate naive T cells (other antigen-presenting cells cannot supply naive T cells with all the signals required for activation). The MHC locus is the most polymorphic region of the entire human genome, and it is responsible for the presentation of antigens to T cells. This extensive polymorphism provides population-level protection by increasing the likelihood that some individuals will mount effective immune responses against novel pathogens, thus helping to ensure species survival during epidemics. Cheetahs, for example, underwent a bottleneck event 10,000 years ago that greatly limited the diversity of their MHC locus and as a result, show increased susceptibility to infectious diseases, though this represents one of multiple factors affecting their conservation status.

CD4 T cells (in general, helper T cells) are able to recognize MHC class II molecules using CD4, and their T-cell receptor recognizes the specific peptide-MHC complex sequence. In contrast, CD8 T cells (in general, killer T cells) are able to recognize MHC class I molecules through the α_{3} domain of MHC class I (it does not recognize β2 microglobulin). T cell receptors are, in general, highly specific to particular peptide-MHC complexes. Some peptide sequences can only be presented by a specific type of MHC protein because they require specific amino acid sequences within the binding groove to associate with them. These are known as MHC-restricted peptides. If an individual does not express the relevant MHC protein needed for a given MHC-restricted peptide, they will not be able to present that antigen to T cells. This can be an important consideration in the design of vaccines, as a robust immune response should be generated in every vaccinee, which will not be possible if it has too many MHC-restricted peptide sequences and the vaccinee does not express the correct MHC polymorphism for effective presentation to T cells. Because the T cell receptor cannot recognize anything not presented on an MHC, conventional (see next paragraph) T cells are not capable of responding to non-peptide antigens (lipids, carbohydrates, etc), except in the case of post-translational modifications to peptides that end up being presented. This is important because polysaccharide vaccines elicit antibody responses without T cell help, and as a result, those antibody responses tend to be weak and short-lived (and young children have a particularly difficult time generating these antibodies for developmental reasons, which is a major issue because the polysaccharides in question are present on the surfaces of pathogenic bacteria). However, attaching the polysaccharide to a carrier protein (especially an immunogenic one, such as tetanus toxoid) enables B cells that recognize the polysaccharide to get help from T cells that recognize the carrier protein's peptides. These are known as conjugate vaccines or glycoconjugates. Moreover, the processing of an antigen by an antigen-presenting cell causes loss of the tertiary structure of the protein, meaning that T cells recognize linear epitopes only (the amino acids recognized have to be next to each other in the primary structure).

There are also subsets of T cells known as unconventional T cells that may recognize non-peptide antigens, or peptides. Many of these subsets show predominantly innate, rather than adaptive, functions. For example, γδ T cells express a T-cell receptor comprising γ and δ chains instead of the α and β chains that conventional T cell receptors use, and they are able to recognize antigen without the need for presenting it on MHC proteins (though some have shown the ability to recognize MHC-presented antigens), instead having a mode of recognition that resembles that of antibodies, or recognizing phosphoantigens (antigens that are phosphorylated) through butyrophilin. Mucosa-associated invariant T cells (MAIT) cells recognize ligands presented by the MHC-related protein MR1, which presents metabolites of riboflavin, pyridoxine, and folates. NKT cells recognize glycolipid antigens presented on CD1d, most prominently α-galactosylceramide.

In contrast to T cell receptors, antibodies can recognize any type of molecule at virtually any size and can recognize either linear or conformational epitopes (the amino acids that comprise an epitope do not need to be next to each other in the primary structure but do need to be near one another when the protein is folded). At the molecular level, an antigen can be characterized by its ability to bind to an antibody's paratopes. Different antibodies have the potential to discriminate among specific epitopes present on the antigen surface.

== Sources ==
Antigens can be classified according to their source.

=== Exogenous antigens ===
Exogenous antigens are antigens that have entered the body from the outside, for example, by inhalation, ingestion or injection. The immune system's response to exogenous antigens is often subclinical. By endocytosis or phagocytosis, exogenous antigens are taken into the antigen-presenting cells (APCs) and processed into fragments. APCs then present the fragments to T helper cells (CD4^{+}) by the use of class II histocompatibility molecules on their surface. Some T cells are specific for the peptide:MHC complex. They become activated and start to secrete cytokines, substances that activate cytotoxic T lymphocytes (CTL), antibody-secreting B cells, macrophages and other particles.

Some antigens start out as exogenous and later become endogenous (for example, intracellular viruses). Intracellular antigens can be returned to circulation upon the destruction of the infected cell.

=== Endogenous antigens ===
Endogenous antigens are generated within normal cells as a result of normal cell metabolism, or because of viral or intracellular bacterial infection. The fragments are then presented on the cell surface in the complex with MHC class I molecules. If activated cytotoxic CD8^{+} T cells recognize them, the T cells secrete various toxins that cause the lysis or apoptosis of the infected cell. In order to keep the cytotoxic cells from killing cells just for presenting self-proteins, the cytotoxic cells (self-reactive T cells) are deleted as a result of tolerance (negative selection). Endogenous antigens include xenogenic (heterologous), autologous and idiotypic or allogenic (homologous) antigens. Sometimes antigens are part of the host itself in an autoimmune disease.

=== Autoantigens ===
An autoantigen or self-antigen is usually a self-protein, but it can also for example be DNA, that is recognized by the immune system of patients with a specific autoimmune disease. Under normal conditions, these self-antigens should not be the target of the immune system, but in autoimmune diseases, their associated T cells and B cells are not deleted and instead attack.

=== Neoantigens ===
Neoantigens are those that are entirely absent from the normal human genome. As compared with nonmutated self-proteins, neoantigens are of relevance to tumor control, as the quality of the T cell pool that is available for these antigens is not affected by central T cell tolerance. Technology to systematically analyze T cell reactivity against neoantigens became available only recently. Neoantigens can be directly detected and quantified.

==== Viral antigens ====
For virus-associated tumors, such as cervical cancer and a subset of head and neck cancers, epitopes derived from viral open reading frames contribute to the pool of neoantigens.

==== Tumor antigens ====
Tumor antigens are those antigens that are presented by MHC class I or MHC class II molecules on the surface of tumor cells. Antigens found only on such cells are called tumor-specific antigens (TSAs) and generally result from a tumor-specific mutation. More common are antigens that are presented by tumor cells and normal cells, called tumor-associated antigens (TAAs). Cytotoxic T lymphocytes that recognize these antigens may be able to destroy tumor cells.

Tumor antigens can appear on the surface of the tumor in the form of, for example, a mutated receptor, in which case they are recognized by B cells.

For human tumors without a viral etiology, novel peptides (neo-epitopes) are created by tumor-specific DNA alterations.

===== Process =====
A large fraction of human tumor mutations are effectively patient-specific. Therefore, neoantigens may also be based on individual tumor genomes. Deep-sequencing technologies can identify mutations within the protein-coding part of the genome (the exome) and predict potential neoantigens. In mice models, for all novel protein sequences, potential MHC-binding peptides were predicted. The resulting set of potential neoantigens was used to assess T cell reactivity. Exome–based analyses were exploited in a clinical setting, to assess reactivity in patients treated by either tumor-infiltrating lymphocyte (TIL) cell therapy or checkpoint blockade. Neoantigen identification was successful for multiple experimental model systems and human malignancies.

The false-negative rate of cancer exome sequencing is low—i.e.: the majority of neoantigens occur within exonic sequence with sufficient coverage. However, the vast majority of mutations within expressed genes do not produce neoantigens that are recognized by autologous T cells.

As of 2015 mass spectrometry resolution is insufficient to exclude many false positives from the pool of peptides that may be presented by MHC molecules. Instead, algorithms are used to identify the most likely candidates. These algorithms consider factors such as the likelihood of proteasomal processing, transport into the endoplasmic reticulum, affinity for the relevant MHC class I alleles and gene expression or protein translation levels.

The majority of human neoantigens identified in unbiased screens display a high predicted MHC binding affinity. Minor histocompatibility antigens, a conceptually similar antigen class are also correctly identified by MHC binding algorithms. Another potential filter examines whether the mutation is expected to improve MHC binding. The nature of the central T-cell receptor-exposed residues of MHC-bound peptides is associated with peptide immunogenicity.

=== Nativity ===
A native antigen is an antigen that is not yet processed by an APC to smaller parts. T cells cannot bind native antigens, but require that they be processed by APCs, whereas B cells can be activated by native ones.

== Antigenic specificity ==
Antigenic specificity is the ability of the host cells to recognize an antigen specifically as a unique molecular entity and distinguish it from another with exquisite precision. Antigen specificity is due primarily to the side-chain conformations of the antigen. It is measurable and need not be linear or of a rate-limited step or equation. Both T cells and B cells are cellular components of adaptive immunity.

== See also ==
- Antigenic escape
- Antitoxin
- Conformational epitope
- Epitope
- Linear epitope
- Magnetic immunoassay
- Neutralizing antibody
- Original antigenic sin
- Paul Ehrlich: Magic Bullet
- Polyclonal B cell response
- Priming (immunology)
