= László Detre =

László Detre may refer to:

- László Detre (microbiologist) (1874–1939), Hungarian physician and microbiologist
- László Detre (astronomer) (1906–1974), Hungarian astronomer
