= Major histocompatibility complex, class I-related =

Protein found in humans

MR1
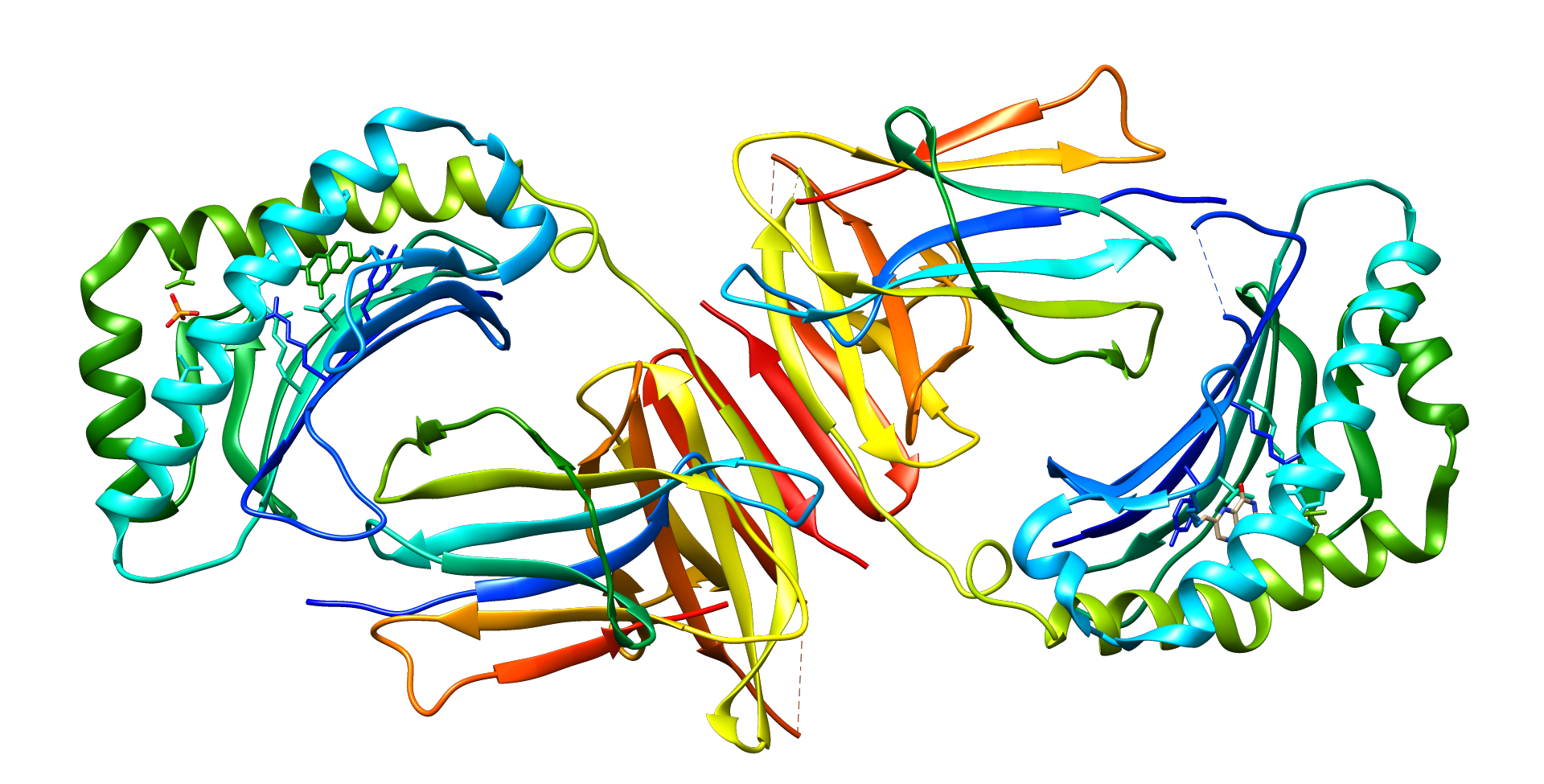

Identifiers
- Aliases: MR1, HLALS, Major histocompatibility complex, class I-related
- External IDs: OMIM: 600764; MGI: 1195463; GeneCards: MR1
Available structures
PDB	Ortholog search: PDBe RCSB
PDB	List of PDB id codes 4GUP, 4L4T, 4L4V, 4LCW, 4NQC, 4NQD, 4NQE, 4PJ5, 4PJ7, 4PJ8, 4PJ9, 4PJA, 4PJB, 4PJC, 4PJD, 4PJE, 4PJF, 4PJG, 4PJH, 4PJI, 4PJX, 5D7J, 5D7I, 5D5M, 5D7L

Gene location (Human)
Chr.	Chromosome 1 (human)
Band	1q25.3	Start	181,033,374 bp
Band	1q25.3	End	181,061,938 bp

Gene location (Mouse)
Chr.	Chromosome 1 (mouse)
Band	1|1 G3	Start	155,003,023 bp
Band	1|1 G3	End	155,022,560 bp
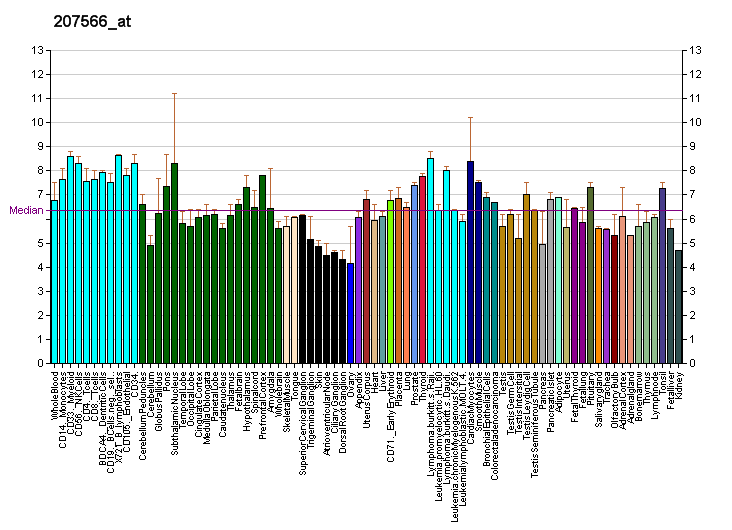

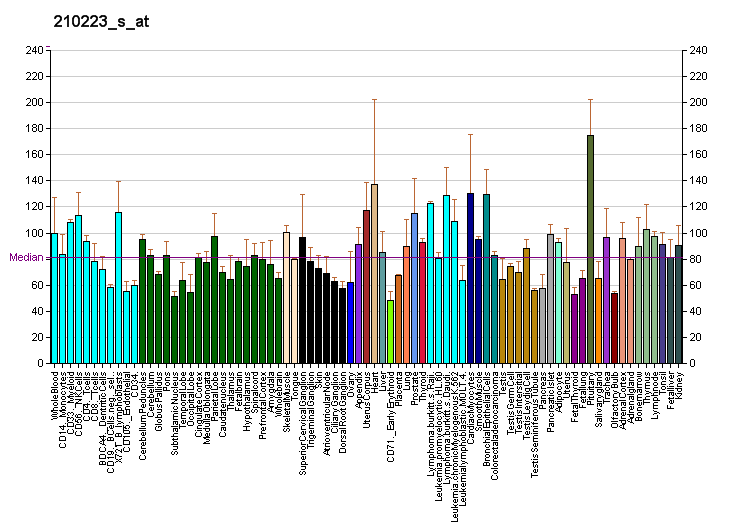

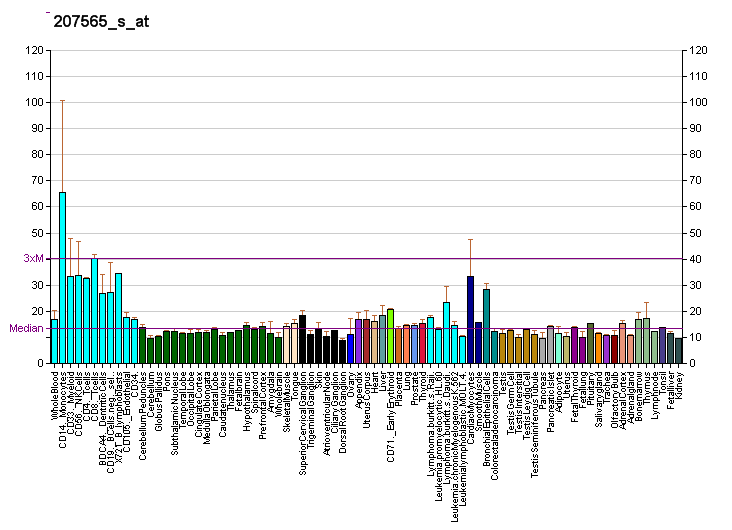
RNA expression pattern
Bgee	Human / Mouse (ortholog); Top expressed in: beta cell; palpebral conjunctiva; monocyte; vena cava; stromal cell of endometrium; blood; visceral pleura; Achilles tendon; smooth muscle tissue; granulocyte / Top expressed in: thymus; ascending aorta; muscle of thigh; aortic valve; transitional epithelium of urinary bladder; temporal muscle; triceps brachii muscle; parotid gland; corneal stroma; esophagus; More reference expression data
BioGPS	More reference expression data
Gene ontology
Molecular function	protein binding; MHC class I receptor activity
Cellular component	extracellular region; endoplasmic reticulum membrane; integral component of membrane; MHC class I protein complex; membrane; endoplasmic reticulum; plasma membrane; extracellular space; external side of plasma membrane
Biological process	cytokine production involved in immune response; antigen processing and presentation of peptide antigen via MHC class I; interleukin-1 beta production; interleukin-17 production; innate immune response; defense response to Gram-negative bacterium; immune system process; immune response; signal transduction
Sources:Amigo / QuickGO
Orthologs
Databases	NCBI: entry; OMA: entry
Species	Human	Mouse
Entrez	3140	15064
Ensembl	ENSG00000153029	ENSMUSG00000026471
UniProt	Q95460	Q8HWB0
RefSeq (mRNA)	NM_001194999; NM_001195000; NM_001195035; NM_001310213; NM_001531 NM_001385161; NM_001385162; NM_001385163; NM_001385164	NM_008209; NM_001355062; NM_001355063
RefSeq (protein)	NP_001181928; NP_001181929; NP_001181964; NP_001297142; NP_001522	NP_032235; NP_001341991; NP_001341992
Location (UCSC)	Chr 1: 181.03 – 181.06 Mb	Chr 1: 155 – 155.02 Mb
PubMed search
- Wikidata
View/Edit Human	View/Edit Mouse

Major histocompatibility complex class I-related gene protein (MR1) is a non-classical MHC class I protein, that binds vitamin metabolites (intermediates of riboflavin synthesis) produced in certain types of bacteria. MR1 interacts with mucosal associated invariant T cells (MAIT).

== Gene location ==
MR1 is a protein that in humans is encoded by the MR1 gene and located on chromosome 1. Non-classical MHC class I genes are very often located on the same chromosome (mice chromosome 17, human chromosome 6) and interspaced within the same loci as the classical MHC genes. MR1 is located on another chromosome, the detailed gene analysis revealed that MR1 is a paralog originated by duplication of MHC locus on chromosome 17 (mice). This functional gene has been found in almost all mammals, proving the importance of MR1 across the mammalian kingdom and the fact that the duplication occurred early in the evolution of vertebrates.

Another non-classical MHC class I CD1 is missing in certain species. There is 90% protein homology of the MR1 binding site between mice and humans. MR1 shares greater homology with classical MHC I class than with non-classical MHC class I. The human MR1 protein has 341 amino acid residues with a molecular weight of 39 366 daltons.

== Structure ==
MR1, like other MHC class I molecules, is composed of α1, α2 and α3 domains. α1 and α2 interact and together bind the antigen. The ligand binding pocket is small and contains aromatic and basic residues. Its small size limits it to only binding molecules of a similarly small size. α3 interacts with β2 microglobulin.

Many different isoforms of MR1 have been identified. Many of the identified proteins have a premature terminating codon which generates non-functional proteins. MR1B isoform lacks the α3 domain. The α3 domain interacts with β2 microglobulin. This interaction and binding of the antigen stabilize the MHC I molecule. In the case of MR1B β2 microglobulin is not needed for stabilization of the structure. MR1B is expressed on the cell surface. This isoform binds antigen via α1 and α2 interaction. Some bacteria are able to target specific β2 microglobulin that enable MHC I presentation. This might be a mechanism used to avoid bacterial immune evasion during bacterial infections.

== Antigen presentation ==
The MR1 protein is capable of binding to molecules derived from bacterial riboflavin biosynthesis, and then present them to MAIT for activation.

MR1 is almost undetectable under physiological conditions, surface expression increase in cells infected by microbes. Due to the antigen necessity for MR1 stabilization. MR1 binds the intermediates of riboflavine synthesis.

Many human cells can present antigens via MR1 with varying efficiency. Human body can't synthesize most of the vitamins, thus the presence of intermediates of riboflavin synthesis is a marker of non-self. Many bacteria are capable of vitamin synthesis. The first discovered MR1 ligand was 6-formyl pterin (6-FP).

Within cells, MR1 is mostly stored inside the endoplasmic reticulum (ER), where ligand binding occurs. Inside the ER, MR1 is stabilised in a ligand-receptive conformation by chaperone proteins tapasin and TAP-binding protein related (TAPBPR) to facilitate ligand binding. After antigen binding MR1 undergoes conformational change, associate with β2 microglobulin and is directed to the cell membrane.

MR1 stimulation is needed for MAIT development in thymus, the mechanism of antigen presentation in thymus is not clear.

== MR1 ligands ==
The MR1 pocket is composed primary of aromatic and basic amino acids and the volume is small, thus suitable for binding small molecule ligands.

The majority of MR1 ligands are uracil analogues, but some non-uracil drug-like molecules also weakly bind to MR1. The ligands 5-OP-RU and 5-OE-RU are compounds derived from riboflavin biosynthesis that bind MR1 for presentation to MAIT cells for activation. They are chemically unstable, but have been synthesised as chemical tools for studying MR1 biology. Ac-6-FP (acetyl-6-formylpterin) and 6-FP (6-formylpterin) also bind MR1, but they do not activate MAIT cells. There is an evidence, that MR1 can bind other antigens. MR1 was able to stimulate T lymphocytes in the presence of Streptococcus pyogenes, that is unable to synthesise riboflavin. MR1 is important in the immune fight against cancer, because MR1 T lymphocytes were able to selectively kill various cancer cells.

== Clinical significance ==
=== Cancer ===
Since the MR1 molecule is involved in presentation of cancer specific antigens and plays a role in tumor immunosurveillance, it has potential use in immunotherapy.

Specific clones of MR1 T lymphocytes (MC.7.G5) were able to kill various cancer cells in vivo and in vitro and were inert to noncancerous cells. The MR1 expression on cancer cells is basal and appeared to be independent of bacterial load and MR1-ligand binding. Interestingly, cancer cell lines lacking a surface expression of MR1 were not killed by MR1 T lymphocytes. Same result was shown in reaction to healthy but stressed or damaged cells, which were unable to activate MR1 T lymphocytes. This again suggests that some MR1 T lymphocytes can specifically react to a cancer cell derived ligand presented on the MR1 molecule.

MAIT cells reactive to bacterial antigens are known as indirect tumor growth promoters with low cytotoxic activity. On the contrary, self-reactive MR1-restricted T cells (described above) not only promote inflammation and have much higher cytotoxic activity but also directly recognize tumor antigens presented on MR1 of cancer cells. This direct contact results in secretion of apoptosis-inducing factors and in death of a cancer cell.

Taken together, immune response triggered by MR1-TCR interaction depends on the antigen presented on the MR1 receptor. As MAIT cells are enriched in mucosal sites like lungs or intestine, we can more likely expect a bacterial antigen presentation, which results in a different reaction of MAIT cells. It is shown that these cells inhibit NK cell and CD8+ T cell effector activity and the production of IFNγ in the response to bacterial antigens presented on MR1. As a result, we should be careful when manipulating with MR1 molecule as a therapeutic target. On one hand its depletion can prevent unpreferable polarization of immune cells and impaired NK and CD8+ T cells activity. On the other hand, as described earlier, cancer cells lacking MR1 had better survival rate as they were not recognized by MR1 T lymphocytes (lower immune surveillance of cancer). To make MR1 molecule truly clinically significant we need to get a better understanding of mechanisms and differences in antigen presentation. In several studies it has been shown that MR1 uses more than one pathway to capture and traffic metabolite antigen depending on its source.

=== Diabetes ===
As gut microbiota is modified in patients with diabetes, it is expected that MR1-TCR interaction will have an impact on the disease progression.

MR1, as has been shown in some studies, plays an important role in promoting inflammation during obesity and Type 2 diabetes (T2D), specifically in adipose tissue and guts. The study showed that mice lacking MR1 had a significantly decreased transcript level of cytokines/chemokines known to be associated with inflammation, such as Ccl2, Ccl5, Il1β, Il6, Il17a, Ifnγ, and Tnfα. In contrast, the transcript level of regulatory factors (Foxp3, Il5, and Il13) was increased.

The situation is a bit different when it comes to Type 1 diabetes (T1D). Both in patients with T1D and in non-obese diabetic (NOD) mice an alteration in frequency and functions of MAIT cells was detected. On the other hand, NOD mice lacking MR1 had greater anti-islet autoreactive T cell response and local activation of dendritic cells which led to pancreatic islet destruction. These mice had overall exacerbated diabetes in comparison to the control group.

=== Inflammatory bowel diseases (IBD) ===
Some studies show that MAIT cells infiltrate the colon in patients with ulcerative colitis. Haga et al. have previously reported that these cells also play an important role in pathogenesis of inflammatory bowel diseases. An important role of MR1-TCR interaction in ulcerative colitis has been shown on MR1-deficient mouse model. Interestingly, both deficient and control mice developed colitis, though survival rate in deficient mice was much higher, than in control group. This deficiency decreased overall inflammation in the colon and reduced colitis severity.

=== Arthritis ===
Both ankylosing spondylitis (AS) and rheumatoid arthritis (RA) are chronic inflammatory diseases affecting mostly bones and joints. Both of these diseases are also known as autoimmune or autoinflammatory diseases due to the presence of specific autoantibodies. It is also worth mentioning that they are often associated with other diseases such as IBD or psoriasis. As microbiome is changed in both IBD and psoriasis, it is expected that MAIT cells will again play an important role in overall pathogenesis of all these conditions. In both AS and RA systemic frequency of MAIT cells was decreased. On the contrary, it was highly elevated in synovial fluid. Also some phenotypical changes have been shown. For example, activation of MAIT cells positively correlated with AS progression in patients. There was also higher production of IL-17 by MAIT cells in peripheral blood and even higher in synovial fluid (none of these appeared in RA). It was observed only in male patients.
