= Original antigenic sin =

Immune phenomenon

The original antigenic sin: When the body first encounters an infection it produces effective antibodies against its dominant antigens and thus eliminates the infection. But when it encounters the same infection, at a later evolved stage, with a new dominant antigen, with the original antigen now being recessive, the immune system will still produce the former antibodies against this old "now recessive antigen" and not develop new antibodies against the new dominant one. This results in the production of ineffective antibodies and thus a weak immunity.

Original antigenic sin, also known as antigenic imprinting, the Hoskins effect, immunological imprinting, or primary addiction is the propensity of the immune system to preferentially use immunological memory based on a previous infection when a second slightly different version of that foreign pathogen (e.g. a virus or bacterium) is encountered. This leaves the immune system "trapped" by the first response it has made to each antigen, and unable to mount potentially more effective responses during subsequent infections. Antibodies or T-cells induced during infections with the first variant of the pathogen are subject to repertoire freeze, a form of original antigenic sin.

The phenomenon has been described in relation to influenza virus, SARS-CoV-2, dengue fever, human immunodeficiency virus (HIV) and to several other viruses.

== History ==
This phenomenon was first described in 1960 by Thomas Francis Jr. in the article "On the Doctrine of Original Antigenic Sin". It is named by analogy to the Christian theological concept of original sin. According to Francis as cited by Richard Krause:

The antibody of childhood is largely a response to dominant antigen of the virus causing the first type A influenza infection of the lifetime. [...] The imprint established by the original virus infection governs the antibody response thereafter. This we have called the Doctrine of the Original Antigenic Sin.

== In B cells ==
A memory B cell specific for Virus A is preferentially activated by a new strain, Virus A^{1}, and produces antibodies that ineffectively bind to the A^{1} strain. These antibodies inhibit activation of a naive B cell that produces better antibodies against Virus A^{1}. This effect leads to a diminished immune response against Virus A^{1} and heightens the potential for serious infection.

During a primary infection, long-lived memory B cells are generated, which remain in the body and protect from subsequent infections. These memory B cells respond to specific epitopes on the surface of viral proteins to produce antigen-specific antibodies and can respond to infection much faster than naive B cells can to novel antigens. This effect lessens time needed to clear subsequent infections.

Between primary and secondary infections or following vaccination, a virus may undergo antigenic drift, in which the viral surface proteins (the epitopes) change through natural mutation. This allows the virus to escape the immune system. The altered virus preferentially reactivates previously activated high-affinity memory B cells and spurs antibody production. However, the antibodies produced generally ineffectively bind to the altered epitopes. In addition, these antibodies inhibit activation of naive B cells that could make more effective antibodies to the second virus. This leads to a less effective immune response and recurrent infections may take longer to clear.

Original antigenic sin has important implications for vaccine development. In dengue fever, for example, once a response against one serotype has been established, it is unlikely that vaccination against a second will be effective. This implies that balanced responses against all four virus serotypes must be established with the first vaccine dose.

Activation of naive B cells that recognize novel epitopes may be attenuated with repeated infection with variant influenza viruses. However, the impact of antigenic sin on protection has not been well established and appears to differ with each infectious agent vaccine, geographic location, and age. Research done in 2011 found reduced antibody responses to the 2009 pandemic H1N1 influenza vaccine in individuals who had been vaccinated against the seasonal A/Brisbane/59/2007 (H1N1) within the previous three months.

The relative ineffectiveness of the bivalent booster against the SARS-CoV-2 Omicron variant in patients who had previously received COVID-19 vaccines has been attributed to immunological imprinting.

== In cytotoxic T cells ==
A similar phenomenon has been described in cytotoxic T cells (CTL). It has been demonstrated that during a second infection by a different strain of dengue virus, the CTLs prefer to release cytokines instead of causing cell lysis. As a result, the production of these cytokines is thought to increase vascular permeability and exacerbate damage to endothelial cells, resulting in dengue hemorrhagic fever.

Several groups have attempted to design vaccines for HIV and hepatitis C based on induction of CTL response. The finding that the CTL response may be biased by original antigenic sin may help to explain the limited effectiveness of these vaccines. Viruses like HIV are highly variable and undergo mutation frequently; due to original antigenic sin, HIV infection induced by viruses that express slightly different epitopes (than those in a viral vaccine) might fail to be controlled by the vaccine. It has been hypothesized that: if original antigenic sin is a common phenomenon, a naively designed single-component vaccine could conceivably make an infection even worse than if no vaccination at all had occurred. The hypothesized mechanism is that the immune response would be "trapped" in a less effective response. Therefore, a recommendation was made for vaccines with multiple components or that target conserved epitopes.

== See also ==
- Antibody-dependent enhancement
- Cell mediated immunity
- Genomic imprinting
- Humoral immunity
- Polyclonal response
- Local optimum
