= Mucosal-associated invariant T cell =

Cell type in the immune system

Mucosal-associated invariant T cells (MAIT cells) make up a subset of T cells in the immune system that display innate, effector-like qualities. In humans, MAIT cells are found in the blood, liver, lungs, and mucosa, defending against microbial activity and infection. The MHC class I-like protein, MR1, is responsible for presenting bacterially-produced vitamin B2 and B9 metabolites to MAIT cells. After the presentation of foreign antigen by MR1, MAIT cells secrete pro-inflammatory cytokines and are capable of lysing bacterially-infected cells. MAIT cells can also be activated through MR1-independent signaling. In addition to possessing innate-like functions, this T cell subset supports the adaptive immune response and has a memory-like phenotype. Furthermore, MAIT cells are thought to play a role in autoimmune diseases, such as multiple sclerosis, arthritis and inflammatory bowel disease, although definitive evidence is yet to be published.

== Molecular characteristics ==
MAIT cells constitute a subset of αβ T lymphocytes characterized by a semi-invariant T cell receptor alpha (TCRα) chain. The TCRα originates from the rearrangement of TCRα variable (V) and joining (J) gene segments TRAV1-2/TRAJ12/20/33 during VDJ recombination in the nucleus. However, TRAJ33 is expressed more often than TRAJ12 and TRAJ20. With little diversity in the TCRα chain, the TCR is more conserved in MAIT cells than in other T cell subsets. In addition, the TCRα chain can combine with a restricted number of possible TCRβ chains to form a functional MAIT cell TCR, further limiting TCR diversity.

MAIT cells were initially specified as T cells that do not express the TCR co-receptors CD4 or CD8 on the cell surface. However, CD8^{+} MAIT cells have been recently observed. In humans, MAIT cells express high levels of CD161, interleukin-18 (IL-18) receptor, and chemokine receptors CCR5, CXCR6, and CCR6 on the cell surface. Additionally, as an indication of their memory-like phenotype in the periphery, mature MAIT cells express a CD44^{+}, CD45RO^{+}, CCR7^{−}, CD62L^{lo} phenotype.

== Development and presence in the body ==
Like all T cell subsets, MAIT cells develop in the thymus. Here, T cells rearrange their TCRs and are subjected to TCR affinity tests as a part of positive selection and negative selection. However, rather than undergoing selection on MHC class I or II molecules, MAIT cells interact with the MHC class I-like molecule, MR1, on thymocytes. MR1 also serves as the antigen-presenting molecule outside of the thymus that binds to TCR and activates MAIT cells. MAIT cells display effector-like qualities before leaving the thymus, which is why they are often described as innate-like T cells in the peripheral tissue. This thymic development process is found in both mice and human MAIT cell populations.

In healthy humans, MAIT cells are found in the lungs, liver, joints, blood, and mucosal tissues, such as the intestinal mucosa. In total, MAIT cells make up roughly 5% of the peripheral T cell population. MAIT cells are most common in the liver, where they usually comprise 20-40% of the T lymphocyte population. Moreover, parenchymal and nonparenchymal liver cells are efficient antigen presenting cells for MAIT. The total murine MAIT cell population is roughly ten times smaller than the human MAIT cell population.

While MAIT cells display effector characteristics immediately out of the thymus, they may also undergo clonal expansion in the periphery and establish antigen memory. In this way, MAIT cells display both innate and adaptive characteristics.

== MAIT cell activation ==
MAIT cells can be activated in ways that involve, and do not involve, MR1-mediated antigen presentation. However, MR1-independent and MR1-dependent activation elicit separate MAIT cell functions as part of an immune response. During MR1-independent activation against Mycobacteria, MAIT cells bind extracellular IL-12, which is often secreted by stressed macrophages. In response to IL-12, MAIT cells produce and secrete interferon-gamma (IFN-γ), a cytokine that activates macrophages, assists in the maturation of dendritic cells, and promotes the expression of MHC class II on antigen presenting cells. MAIT cells also secrete IL-17, an important pro-inflammatory cytokine, after binding IL-23.

MAIT cells are also activated in a MR1-dependent manner, in which a MAIT cell's semi-invariant TCR binds to the MR1 protein presenting antigen. While most T cell subsets have TCRs that recognize peptide or lipid-based antigens in association with MHC or CD1, MAIT cells are unique in that they recognize small molecules created through the process of vitamin B2 (riboflavin) and B9 (folic acid) biosynthesis. The vitamin B2 related molecules that activate MAIT cells are chemically unstable, and undergo spontaneous degradation in water, although they have now been successfully chemically synthesised and isolated. Riboflavin and folic acid are both crucial components of the metabolic pathways in bacteria. When MR1 associates with these small molecules and becomes expressed on the surface of antigen-presenting cells, the MAIT TCR then binds to MR1, leading to MAIT cell activation, clonal expansion, memory, and an array of antimicrobial responses. While protective against some pathogens, MAIT cell activation can produce inflammatory cytokines that augment immunopathology and gastritis in chronic infection by Helicobacter pylori.

== MAIT cell antigens ==
MAIT cells are activated by compounds derived from bacterial vitamin B2 (riboflavin) biosynthesis. In 2014, the exact identity of the antigens were found to be the compounds 5-OP-RU (5-(2-oxopropylideneamino)-6-D-ribitylaminouracil) and 5-OE-RU (5-(2-oxoethylideneamino)-6-D-ribitylaminouracil). Both compounds are highly potent in activating MAIT cells, but are chemically unstable. Both have been chemically synthesised, stabilised and characterised in the solvent DMSO, allowing for the unstable compounds to be used as reagents for the study of MAIT cells.

A chemically stable antigen that is functionally similar to 5-OP-RU has also been created.

A 2017 study also found that some common drugs and drug-like molecules can modulate MAIT cell function in mammals.

MAIT cell antigen precursor can cross the intestinal blood barrier and is needed for MAIT cell development. Moreover serum from human patients can activate MAIT cells in a MR1 dependent manner.

== MR1 ==
Like MHC class I, MR1 is found in a large variety of cells and associates with β2-microglobulin. However, it remains to be understood whether certain cell types, such as myeloid or epithelial cells, more commonly display antigen to MAIT. While MHC class I alleles are extremely diverse in human populations, MR1 is non-polymorphic and highly conserved. In fact, when comparing the genetic content of humans and mice to each other, there is a 90% similarity in MR1 coding sequences. Furthermore, the ligand-binding grooves of MR1 molecules differ from those of MHC class I molecules in that they are smaller in size and specifically bind metabolic products of bacteria.

MR1 is found intracellularly in the endoplasmic reticulum and interacts with some of the common MHC loading complex components and chaperone proteins (e.g. TAP, ERp57, and tapasin). The loading of vitamin B metabolic molecules onto MR1 occurs in a way that is different from peptide loading onto MHC class I. Yet the specifics of this process must be further looked into.

In healthy cells, MR1 is sparsely exhibited on the cell surface. However, MR1 expression is upregulated on the surface after cell infection or the introduction of a bacterially-produced MR1 ligand. Once expressed on the surface, MR1, with its antigen ligand covalently-attached, binds to the appropriate MAIT cell TCR.

== Microbial and viral response ==
MAIT cells display effector-like qualities, allowing them to directly respond to microbial pathogens immediately following activation. In a MR1-dependent manner, MAIT cells respond to bacteria by producing cytokines and strengthening their cytotoxic functions. After TCR binding and activation, MAIT cells secrete several cytokines, including tumor necrosis factor alpha (TNF-α), IFN-γ, and IL-17. These cytokines are pro-inflammatory and activate important cells in the immune response, such as macrophages and dendritic cells. After activation, MAIT cells also produce cytolytic molecules perforin and granzyme B, which form pores in the bacterially-infected cells, leading to apoptosis and the elimination of dangerous microbes from the body.

MAIT cells can target a wide variety of microbes, including Staphylococcus aureus, Staphylococcus epidermidis, Escherichia coli Mycobacterium tuberculosis, Candida albicans, and Salmonella enterica, to name a few. However, some types of bacteria, including strains of Listeria and Enterobacter, may escape MAIT cell targeting. These strains avoid MAIT cell-mediated elimination because they have unusual riboflavin metabolic pathways that do not produce viable ligands for MR1 molecules.

While MAIT cells have not been found to target viruses in a TCR-dependent manner, they can respond against viruses upon stimulation with IL-18 and other cytokines, such as IL-12 and IFN-α/β. After receiving these cytokine signals, MAIT cells secrete anti-viral cytotoxic molecules and cytokines that aid the immune response.

== Tissue repair ==
The role of MAIT cells in tissue repair is an evolving topic in murine models and humans. After their TCR dependent activation cutaneous MAIT cells initiate support wound repair mechanisms. One reason for their involvement is their localization which is predominantly near the interface of the dermis and in lesser extend in the epidermis, in close proximity to the basal layer. This stands in contrast to the localization of conventional T-cells which are under normal physiological conditions predominantly in the epidermis localized close to hair follicles. MAIT cells have therefore a superior localization for reaction to tissue disruption. Upon TCR stimulation MAIT cells react with a rapid, polyfunctional, proinflammatory response correlating with the production of a broad array of proinflammatory cytokines and chemokines like IL-1A, IL-1B, IL-2, IL-22, GM-CSF, CCL3, CCL4 and CCL20, and the recruitment of neutrophils via CCL2 and CXCL2 in an MR1-dependent manner. Additionally to cytokine production after TCR stimulation MAIT express a tissue repair signature typical for unconventional Th17 cells, this signature is independent of MAIT stimulation with cytokines and does not appear when stimulated with cytokine-mediate stimulation alone. This gene expression points to the role of MAIT in tissue homeostasis and uncovers a potential link between maintaining and repairing a barrier with more conventional antimicrobial functions at barrier surfaces. The gene signature is similar in both human and mice and includes among others immune genes involved in tissue repair (TNF, PTGES2, TGFB1, CCL3, HMGB1), proteases (Furin, MMP25), growth factors (GM-CSF, M-CSF, PDGFB, LIF) as well as angiogenic genes (HIF1A, VEGFB). This expression profile was first shown in RORyt+ CD8+T-cells, which reside in the mouse and human skin and are next to the acceleration of wound repair also responsible for the response to commensal bacteria. Naturally the activation of MAIT cells critically depends on the presence of co-activating signals from the local innate immune system, suggesting a two-signal model, similar to conventional T-cell activation. Although activation through only TCR is sufficient to generate the described tissue repair gene profile and therefore promoting tissue repair.

In vitro wound healing assays have shown that MAIT-containing CD8+ T-cell populations stimulated with E.coli are able to significantly accelerate wound closure, mostly at later stages in the healing process. Though this effect is reduced after blocking of MR1, compared to non-blocked MR1. This underscores the importance of MR1 in the context of TCR signaling. TCR dependent activation is essential for expression of tissue-repair-associated molecules by MAIT cells. This allows MAIT cells to initiate and accelerate important aspects of tissue repair like the migration and proliferation of epithelial-type cells.

=== Intestine homeostasis ===
Even though the gene signature which is descriptive for tissue repair has been repeatedly described, the exact mechanism of the contribution of MAIT to this process cells remains unclear. The specific gene signature appears to be expressed in MAIT cells for acceleration of the cellular monolayer regrowth after physical damage or other irradiation of the skin. Furthermore, this function of MAIT cells contributes daily to an important homeostatic role which keeps the intestinal barrier integrity, namely through aiding the healing of microscopic injuries which occur on a frequent basis in the intestine. This process modulates certain disease severities like the ones of Type 1 diabetes, acute GvHD and liver disease. The microbiome components involved in this response, and the effects of specific changes in the microbiome are possible key factors in MAIT function.

== Role in autoimmunity ==
While MAIT cells play a crucial role in the immune system by targeting bacterially-infected cells and other pathogens, they may also attack healthy cells and play a role in certain autoimmune diseases.

=== Multiple sclerosis ===
For individuals with the autoimmune disease multiple sclerosis (MS), the immune system attacks the myelin sheaths covering nerves, causing impaired nerve signaling. While T helper 1 (Th1) and T helper 17 (Th17) cells have been reported as contributors to MS by increasing inflammation at myelin sites, human MAIT cells have also been observed at these sites. In addition, during periods of myelin degeneration, MAIT cell levels in the peripheral blood have been found to decrease, suggesting their tendency to migrate to sites of MS-related inflammation. At these sites, MAIT cells further contribute to the autoimmune response by secreting pro-inflammatory cytokines. However, in contrast to these findings, MAIT cells have also been found to display a protective role in MS by limiting Th1 cell secretion of IFN-γ at sites of inflammation. To explain these findings, the role of MAIT cells in MS must be further explored.

=== Inflammatory bowel disease ===
In autoimmune-related inflammatory bowel disease, the immune system initiates a response against healthy parts of the gastrointestinal tract, such as the mucosal microbiome. During relapse periods of certain types of inflammatory bowel disease, such as Crohn's disease, MAIT cells have been found to migrate to sites of inflammation, triggering the harmful responses of other immune cells through the expression of NKG2D and increasing inflammation by secreting IL-17.

=== Rheumatic disease ===
In systematic autoimmune rheumatic diseases, such as rheumatoid arthritis and systemic lupus erythematosus (SLE), MAIT cells are activated through TCR-independent signaling. Stimulated by IL-12, IL-18, and IL-23, MAIT cells can produce and secrete pro-inflammatory cytokines, drawing immune cells into areas of the autoimmune attack. In this way, MAIT cells facilitate and intensify the harmful effects of systematic autoimmune rheumatic diseases.

== See also ==
- T cell#Mucosal associated invariant T cells
