= Self-protein =

Self-protein refers to all proteins endogenously produced by DNA-level transcription and translation within an organism of interest. This does not include proteins synthesized due to viral infection, but may include those synthesized by commensal bacteria within the intestines. Proteins that are not created within the body of the organism of interest, but nevertheless enter through the bloodstream, a breach in the skin, or a mucous membrane, may be designated as "non-self" and subsequently targeted and attacked by the immune system. Tolerance to self-protein is crucial for overall wellbeing; when the body erroneously identifies self-proteins as "non-self", the subsequent immune response against endogenous proteins may lead to the development of an autoimmune disease.

== Examples ==
Proteins targeted by the immune system	Resulting autoimmune disease
Thyroid stimulating hormone receptor	Graves' disease
Pancreatic beta-cell proteins	Type 1 diabetes mellitus
Nuclear and cell membrane phospholipids	Lupus
Tissue transglutaminase	Celiac disease

Of note, the list provided above is not exhaustive; the list does not mention all possible proteins targeted by the provided autoimmune diseases.

== Identification by the immune system ==
Autoimmune responses and diseases are primarily instigated by T lymphocytes that are incorrectly screened for reactivity to self-protein during cell development.

During T-cell development, early T-cell progenitors first move via chemokine gradients from the bone marrow into the thymus, where T-cell receptors are randomly rearranged at the gene level to allow for T-cell receptor generation. These T-cells have the potential to bind to anything, including self-proteins.

The immune system must differentiate the T-cells that have receptors capable of binding to self versus non-self proteins; T-cells that can bind to self-proteins must be destroyed to prevent development of an autoimmune disorder. In a process known as "Central Tolerance", T-cells are exposed to cortical epithelial cells that express a variety of different major histocompatibility complexes (MHC) of both class 1 and class 2, which have the ability to bind to T-cell receptors of CD8+ cytotoxic T-cells, and CD4+ helper T-cells, respectively. The T-cells that display affinity for these MHC are positively selected to continue to the second stage of development, while those that cannot bind to MHC undergo apoptosis. In the second stage, immature T-cells are exposed to a variety of macrophages, dendritic cells, and medullary epithelial cells that express self-protein on MHC class 1 and class 2. These epithelial cells also express the transcription factor labelled autoimmune regulator (AIRE) – this crucial transcription factor allows the medullary epithelial cells of the thymus to express proteins that would normally be present in peripheral tissue rather than in an epithelial cell, such as insulin-like peptides, myelin-like peptides, and more. As these epithelial cells now present a large variety of self-proteins that could be encountered across the body, the immature T-cells are tested for affinity to self-protein and self-MHC. If any T-cell has strong affinity for self-protein and self-MHC, the cell undergoes apoptosis to prevent autoimmune function. T-cells that display low or medium affinity are allowed to leave the thymus and circulate throughout the body to react to novel non-self antigen. In this manner, the body attempts to systematically destroy T-cells that could lead to autoimmunity.
