= László Detre (microbiologist) =

Hungarian microbiologist (1874–1939)

László Detre (October 29, 1874, Nagysurány – May 7, 1939, Washington, DC (a.k.a. Ladislas Deutsch, Ladislaus Deutsch) was a Hungarian physician and microbiologist, the founder and first director of the Hungarian Serum Institute in Budapest.

Detre coined the term "antigen" in a 1903 French-language paper co-authored with Russian biologist Élie Metchnikoff (referring to "substances immunogènes ou antigènes"), although the word and concept appears in his research as early as 1899. He is also a codiscoverer of the Wassermann reaction, publishing his discovery in humans just two weeks after Wassermann documented his findings in apes.
