= T independent antigen (TI) =

Category of antigens in immunology

T independent antigens elicit antibody production by B lymphocytes without T lymphocyte involvement. There are two distinct subgroups of TI antigens, different in mechanism of activating B lymphocytes: TI-1 antigen, which has an activity that can directly activate B cells and TI-2 antigen, which has highly repetitive structure and causes simultaneous cross-linking of specific B cell receptors (BCR) on B lymphocytes. The most commonly released isotype of antibodies in this type of immune reaction is low-affinity immunoglobulin M (IgM).

== Antibody production independent of T lymphocytes ==
For most protein antigens, the production of antibodies by B lymphocytes is dependent on stimulation of helper T cells. However bacterial polysaccharides and lipopolysaccharides, and some polymeric proteins, can stimulate B lymphocytes without involvement of helper T cells. The non-protein microbial antigens cannot stimulate classical T cell response by themselves, but they are able to elicit the production of antibodies, so that is why we call them T cell or thymus independent antigens.

T independent antigens are divided into two classes by the mechanism of activating B cells.

=== T-Independent-1 antigen ===
TI-1 antigens have an intrinsic B cell activating activity, that can directly cause proliferation and differentiation of B lymphocytes without T cell stimulation and independently of their BCR specificity. TI-1 antigens activate B-cells via Toll like receptors, which are expressed in humans on the surface of B lymphocytes after BCR stimulation. TI-1 antigens are classified as B-cell mitogens, because they induce numerous cell divisions. In higher concentrations, TI-1 antigens bind to BCR and TLR of various clones of B lymphocytes, which leads to production of multiclonal antibodies. But when the concentration of TI-1 is lower, it can activate only B lymphocytes with specific binding of TI-1 on their BCR, and leads to production of monoclonal antibodies. This part of immune response may be important in some early stages of infection by extracellular pathogens, because it is rapidly activated and does not require T cell help or clonal maturation and expansion. An example of TI-1 antigen is lipopolysaccharide (LPS) or bacterial DNA.

=== T-Independent-2 antigen ===
The second group of TI antigens consists mainly of highly repetitive surface structures (epitopes) of encapsulated bacteria. They do not have an intrinsic B-cell activating activity. The activation of B lymphocytes is caused by cross-linking of a critical number of B cell receptors, which leads to accumulation of BCRs and cross activation of these receptors. It results in proliferation and differentiation of B lymphocytes and production of antibodies. TI-2 antigens can activate only mature B lymphocytes. Immature B cells are anergized, so they do not elicit any immune response. That may explain why children up to 5 years are not capable of producing effective antibodies against polysaccharide antigens, as the majority of their B cell population is immature. Even though the response on TI antigens is not dependent on T lymphocytes, there are some cytokines, produced mainly by T lymphocytes and natural killer (NK) cells, necessary for eliciting reaction against these antigens. The most necessary are interleukin 2 (IL-2), interleukin 3 (IL-3) and interferon γ (IFN-γ). Moreover, additional stimulation by dendritic cells (DC) and macrophages is required.
