= Immunoglobulin-binding protein =

Immunoglobulin-binding protein, or sometimes Immunoglobulin binding protein is a generic name for any protein that binds immunoglobulins. It, therefore, can mean:

- Binding immunoglobulin protein (BiP, or heat shock 70 kDa protein 5, with an official symbol HSPA5), a HSP70 molecular chaperone located in the lumen of the endoplasmic reticulum.
- Immunoglobulin-binding protein 1 (IGBP1), a protein that binds B-cells in the blood.
- Protein A, a 42 kDa protein originally found in the cell wall of the bacteria Staphylococcus aureus.
- Protein G, expressed in group C and G Streptococcal bacteria much like Protein A.
- Protein L, isolated from the surface of a bacterium Peptostreptococcus magnus.
- Protein M, found on the cell surface of a bacterium Mycoplasma genitalium.
