= Index of protein-related articles =

Proteins are a class of biomolecules composed of amino acid chains.

== Biochemistry ==
- Antifreeze protein, class of polypeptides produced by certain fish, vertebrates, plants, fungi and bacteria
- Conjugated protein, protein that functions in interaction with other chemical groups attached by covalent bonds
- Conformational ensembles, the study of the structure of flexible proteins and their possible configurations, that are represented by sets of models called conformational ensembles or structural ensembles
- Denatured protein, protein which has lost its functional conformation
- Matrix protein, structural protein linking the viral envelope with the virus core
- Intrinsically disordered proteins or intrinsically unstructured proteins or simply flexible proteins are protein that, lacking a fixed tertiary structure, can assume various conformations based on the conditions within which they interact with within the cell
- Protein A, bacterial surface protein that binds antibodies
- Protein A/G, recombinant protein that binds antibodies
- Protein C, anticoagulant
- Protein G, bacterial surface protein that binds antibodies
- Protein L, bacterial surface protein that binds antibodies
- Protein S, plasma glycoprotein
- Protein Z, glycoprotein
- Protein catabolism, the breakdown of proteins into amino acids and simple derivative compounds
- Protein complex, group of two or more associated proteins
- Protein dynamics, the study of the transitions between protein conformational states
- Protein electrophoresis, method of analysing a mixture of proteins by means of gel electrophoresis
- Protein folding, process by which a protein assumes its characteristic functional shape or tertiary structure
- Protein isoform, version of a protein with some small differences
- Protein kinase, enzyme that modifies other proteins by chemically adding phosphate groups to them
- Protein ligands, atoms, molecules, and ions which can bind to specific sites on proteins
- Protein microarray, piece of glass on which different molecules of protein have been affixed at separate locations in an ordered manner
- Protein phosphatase, enzyme that removes phosphate groups that have been attached to amino acid residues of proteins
- Protein purification, series of processes intended to isolate a single type of protein from a complex mixture
- Protein sequencing, protein method
- Protein splicing, intramolecular reaction of a particular protein in which an internal protein segment is removed from a precursor protein
- Protein structure, unique three-dimensional shape of amino acid chains
- Protein targeting, mechanism by which a cell transports proteins to the appropriate positions in the cell or outside of it
- Protein-protein docking, the determination of the molecular structure of complexes formed by two or more proteins
- Protein-protein interaction, the association of protein molecules and the study of these associations from the perspective of biochemistry
- RACK protein, receptor responsible for the binding of active forms of the protein kinase C family of enzymes
- Secretory protein, protein which is secreted by a cell

== Bioengineering ==
- Protein production, the generation of a pure protein
- Protein design, the design of new protein molecules from scratch
- Protein engineering, application of science, mathematics, and economics to the process of developing useful or valuable proteins

== Genetics ==
- Fibrous protein, long filamentous protein molecule that forms one of the two main classes of tertiary structure protein
- Fusion protein, protein created through genetic engineering from two or more proteins
- Globular protein, one of the two main protein classes
- Protein family, group of evolutionarily related proteins
- Protein methods, techniques used to study proteins
- Protein subunit, single protein molecule that assembles with other protein molecules to form a multimeric or oligomeric protein
- Regulatory protein, term used in genetics to describe a protein involved in regulating gene expression

== Medicine ==
- Tau protein, microtubule-associated protein found in neurons in the brain

== Membrane biology ==
- G protein, family of proteins involved in second messenger cascades
- Membrane protein, protein molecule that is attached to, or associated with, the membrane of a cell or an organelle
- Transmembrane protein, integral membrane protein that spans from the internal to the external surface of the biological membrane
- Transport protein, protein involved in the movement of a chemical across a biological membrane

== Nutrition ==
- Protein (nutrient), role of protein in nutrition
- Protein quality, assessment of the digestibility and amino acid composition of different proteins
- Casein, a family of related phosphoproteins that are commonly found in mammalian milk, comprising about 80% of the proteins in cow's milk.
- Mycoprotein, fungal protein sometimes used as a meat substitute.
- Protein supplement, dietary supplement or a bodybuilding supplement, and may take the form of a protein bar or protein powder.
- Pea protein, derived and extracted from yellow and green split peas, Pisum sativum.
- Rice protein, an alternative to the more common whey and soy protein isolates.
- Soy protein, storage protein held in discrete particles called protein bodies
- Whey protein, the name for a collection of globular proteins that can be isolated from whey

== See also ==
- List of biological databases
- Protein Data Bank
- Protein K (disambiguation)
- Protein synthesis
- Protein-coated
