= SpAB protein domain =

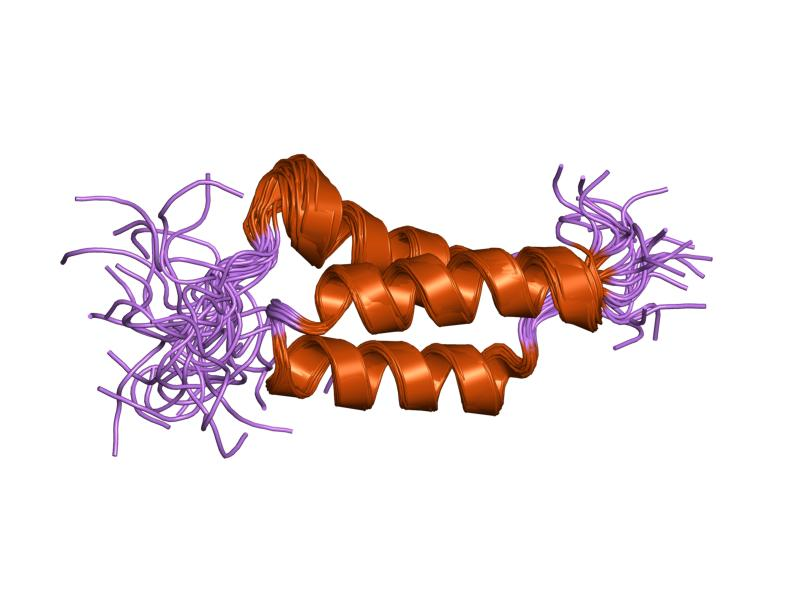
- Staphylococcal Protein A, b-domain

Identifiers
- Symbol: B
- Pfam: PF02216
- InterPro: IPR003132
- SMART: TBC
- PROSITE: PDOC00957
- MEROPS: S12
- SCOP2: 1ehx / SCOPe / SUPFAM
- TCDB: 9.B.4
- CAZy: GH58
Available protein structures:
- Pfam: structures / ECOD
- PDB: RCSB PDB; PDBe; PDBj
- PDBsum: structure summary

In molecular biology, the domain B, refers to the immunoglobulin-binding domain found in the Staphylococcus aureus virulence factor protein A (SpA). Hence, it is abbreviated to SpA_{B}.

== Function ==
SpA_{B} enables theStaphylococcus aureus bacteria to evade the host's immune system through the disruption of opsonization and phagocytosis. It does this though SpA_{B} binding to the Fc fragment of IgG.

== Structure ==
The B domain of SpA (SpAB) consists of three a-helices which are retained upon interaction with the Fc fragment of IgG. Protein A contains five highly homologous immunoglobulin (Ig)-binding domains in tandem (designated domains E, D, A, B and C), which share a common structure consisting of three helices in a closed left-handed twist. Protein A can exist in both secreted and membrane-bound forms, and has two distinct Ig-binding activities: each domain can bind Fc-gamma (the constant region of IgG involved in effector functions) and Fab (the Ig fragment responsible for antigen recognition).

The native state of the B domain, deviates a lot since its inter-helical angles fluctuate. It appears to be relatively thermodynamically more stable than the E domain. The increased stability of the B domain may be due to heightened mobility, and therefore entropy, in the native state and decreased mobility entropy in the more compact denatured state.
