= Immunogold labelling =

Staining technique used in electron microscopy

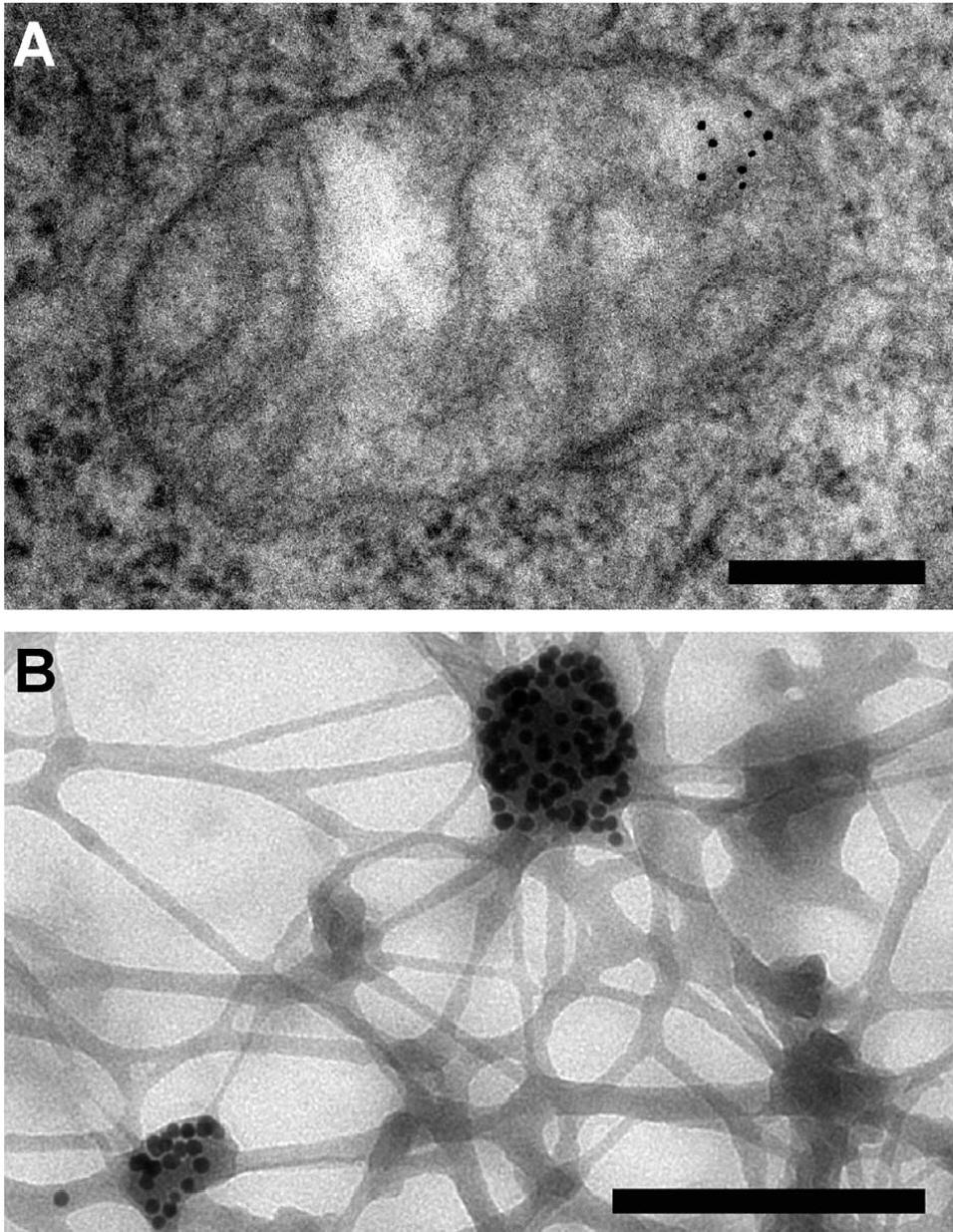
Two images produced using immunogold labeling and transmission electron microscopy: (A) Gold particles are marking mtDNA near the mitochondria (B) mtDNA marked with gold particles after extraction.

Immunogold labeling or immunogold staining (IGS) is a staining technique used in electron microscopy. This staining technique is an equivalent of the indirect immunofluorescence technique for visible light. Colloidal gold particles are most often attached to secondary antibodies which are in turn attached to primary antibodies designed to bind a specific antigen or other cell component. Gold is used for its high electron density which increases electron scatter to give high contrast 'dark spots'.

First used in 1971, immunogold labeling has been applied to both transmission electron microscopy and scanning electron microscopy, as well as brightfield microscopy. The labeling technique can be adapted to distinguish multiple objects by using differently-sized gold particles.

Immunogold labeling can introduce artifacts, as the gold particles reside some distance from the labelled object and very thin sectioning is required during sample preparation.

== History ==
Immunogold labeling was first used in 1971 by Faulk and Taylor to identify Salmonella antigens. It was initially applied in transmission electron microscopy (TEM) and was especially useful in highlighting proteins found in low densities, such as certain cell surface antigens. As the resolution of scanning electron microscopy (SEM) improved, so did the need for nanoparticle-sized labels such as immunogold. In 1975, Horisberger and colleagues successfully visualised gold nanoparticles with a diameter of less than 30 nm and this soon became an established SEM technique.

== Technique ==
First, a thin section of the sample is cut, often using a microtome. Various other stages of sample preparation may then take place.

The prepared sample is incubated with a specific antibody designed to bind to the molecule of interest. Next, a secondary antibody with attached gold particles is added, which binds to the primary antibody. Gold can also be attached to protein A or protein G instead of a secondary antibody, as these proteins bind to mammalian IgG Fc regions in a non-specific way.

The electron-dense gold particle can then be seen under an electron microscope as a black dot, indirectly labeling the molecule of interest.

== Labeling multiple objects ==
Immunogold labeling can be used to visualize more than one target simultaneously. In electron microscopy, this can be achieved by using two differently sized gold particles. An extension of this method has used three different sized gold particles to track the localisation of regulatory peptides. A more complex approach to multi-site labeling involves labeling opposite sides of an antigenic site separately; the immunogold particles attached to both sides can then be viewed simultaneously.

== Uses in brightfield microscopy ==
Although immunogold labeling is typically used for transmission electron microscopy, when the gold is 'silver-enhanced' it can be seen using brightfield microscopy. The silver enhancement increases the particle size, also making scanning electron microscopy possible.

To produce silver-enhanced gold particles, colloidal gold is placed in an acidic enhancing solution containing silver ions. The gold particles act as a nucleation sites, and silver is deposited onto them. An example of silver-enhanced immunogold labeling (IGSS) is its use in identifying the pathogen Erwinia amylovora.

== Limitations ==
An inherent limitation to the immunogold technique is that the gold particle is around 15-30 nm away from the site to which the primary antibody is bound (when using a primary and secondary antibodies labeling strategy). The precise location of the targeted molecule can therefore not be accurately calculated. Gold particles can be created with a diameter of 1 nm (or lower) but another limitation is then realized—at these sizes the gold label becomes hard to distinguish from tissue structure.

Thin sections are required for immunogold labeling and these can produce misleading images; a thin slice of a cell component may not give an accurate view of its three-dimensional structure. For example, a microtubule may appear as a 'spike' depending on which plane the sectioning occurred. To overcome this limitation serial sections can be taken, which can then be compiled into a three-dimensional image.

A further limitation is that antibodies and gold particles cannot penetrate the resin used to embed samples for imaging. Thus, only accessible molecules can be targeted and visualized. Labeling prior to embedding the sample can reduce the negative impact of this limitation.

== See also ==
- Immunohistochemistry
