= B1 domain =

B1
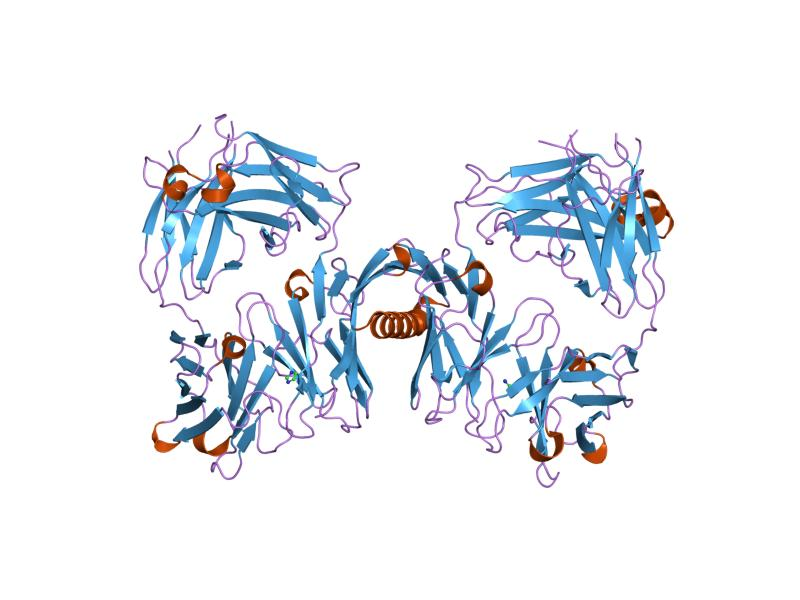
- antibody-antigen complex

Identifiers
- Symbol: B1
- Pfam: PF02246
- InterPro: IPR003147
- SMART: PB1
- SCOP2: 1ipg / SCOPe / SUPFAM
Available protein structures:
- Pfam: structures / ECOD
- PDB: RCSB PDB; PDBe; PDBj
- PDBsum: structure summary

In molecular biology, the protein domain b1 refers to the domain b1 of Protein L. L is a bacterial protein with immunoglobulin (Ig) light chain-binding properties. It contains a number of homologous b1 repeats towards the N terminus. These repeats have been found to be responsible for the interaction of protein L with Ig light chains. N-terminus domain contains five homologous B1 repeats of 72-76 amino acids each.
