= Protean (disambiguation) =

Protean is the adjectival form of the Greek sea-god name Proteus.

Protean may also refer to:

- Protean eGov Technologies, an Indian technology company
- Protean Electric, British automotive technology company

== See also ==
- Protein (disambiguation)
- Proteus (disambiguation)
- proteanTecs, a technology company
