= Protein (disambiguation) =

Protein is an organic compound made of amino acids.

Protein may also refer to:

- Protein (nutrient)
- Protein (band), an American band
- Protein (film), a 2024 crime thriller film

== See also ==
- List of topics related to protein
