= M protein =

M protein may refer to:

- M protein (Streptococcus), a virulence factor of the bacterium Streptococcus pyogenes
- Viral matrix protein, structural protein linking the viral envelope with the virus capsid
- Coronavirus membrane protein, structural protein expressed from the M gene in coronaviruses
- Myeloma protein, also called paraprotein, an abnormal protein in the urine or blood, often seen in multiple myeloma or monoclonal gammopathy of undetermined significance
- MYOM2 (Myomesin-2), a protein composing the M-line of muscle cell sarcomeres
- Protein M, immunoglobulin-binding protein found on the surface of the bacterium Mycoplasma genitalium
