= Protein M =

Immunoglobulin-binding protein

IgG-blocking protein M

Identifiers
- Symbol: M_MG281
- InterPro: IPR030943
Available protein structures:
- PDB: IPR030943
- AlphaFold: IPR030943

Uncharacterized protein MG281

Identifiers
- Organism: Mycoplasma genitalium ATCC 33530
- Symbol: MG281
- UniProt: P47523
Search for
- Structures: Swiss-model
- Domains: InterPro

Protein M (locus MG281) is an immunoglobulin-binding protein originally found on the cell surface of the human pathogenic bacterium Mycoplasma genitalium. It is presumably a universal antibody-binding protein, as it is known to be reactive against all antibody types tested so far. It is capable of preventing the antigen-antibody interaction due to its high binding affinity to any antibody. The Scripps Research Institute announced its discovery in 2014. It was detected from the bacterium while investigating its role in patients with a cancer, multiple myeloma.

Homologous proteins are found in other Mycoplasma bacteria. Mycoplasma pneumoniae, another human pathogen, has a homolog termed IbpM (locus MPN400).

== Discovery ==
Mycoplasma genitalium was discovered in 1980 from two male patients with non-gonococcal urethritis at St Mary's Hospital, Paddington, London. After two years, in 1983, it was identified as a new species. After several years of intense research, it was found to be the cause of sexually transmitted diseases, such as urethritis (inflammation of the urinary tract) both in men and women, and also cervicitis (inflammation of cervix) and pelvic inflammation in women. However, the molecular nature of its pathogenicity remained unknown for three decades.

On 6 February 2014, The Scripps Research Institute announced the discovery of a novel protein, which they named Protein M, from the M. genitalium cell membrane. Scientists identified the protein during investigations on the origin of multiple myeloma, a type of B-cell carcinoma. To understand the long-term M. genitalium infection, Rajesh Grover, a senior staff scientist in the Lerner laboratory, tested antibodies from the blood samples of patients with multiple myeloma against different Mycoplasma species. He found that M. genitalium was particularly responsive to all types of antibodies he tested from 20 patients. The antibody reactivity was found to be due to an undiscovered protein that is chemically responsive to all types of human and non-human antibodies available. When they isolated and analysed the protein, they discovered that it was unique both in structure and biological functions. Its structure has no resemblance to any known protein listed in the Protein Data Bank.

== Structure and properties ==
Protein M is about 50 kDa in size, and composed of 556 amino acids. Contrary to the initial hypothesis that the antibody reactions could be an immune response to mass infection with the bacterium, they found that Protein M evolved simply to bind to any antibody it encounters, with specifically high affinity. By this property the bacterium can effectively evade the immune system of the host. This makes the protein an ideal target for developing new drugs. Rajesh Grover estimated that the protein can bind to an average of 100,000,000 different kinds of antibodies circulating in human blood.

Unlike functionally similar proteins such as Protein A, Protein G, and Protein L, which all contain small, multiple immunoglobulin domains, Protein M has a large domain of 360 amino acid residues that binds primarily to the variable light chain of the immunoglobulin, as well as a binding site called LRR-like motif. In addition, Protein M has a C-terminal domain with 115 amino acid residues that probably protrudes over the antibody binding site, blocking the antibody paratope. It binds to an antibody at either κ or λ light chains using hydrogen bonds and salt bridges, from backbone atoms and conserved side chains, and some conserved van der Waals interactions with other nonconserved interactions.
