= GA module =

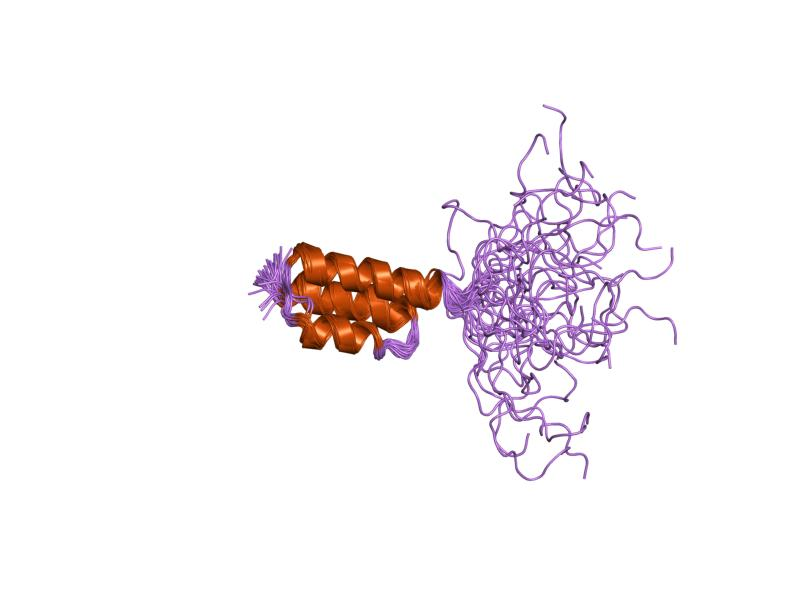
- solution structure of the albumin binding domain of streptococcal protein g

Identifiers
- Symbol: GA
- Pfam: PF01468
- InterPro: IPR002988
- SMART: TBC
- PROSITE: PDOC00406
- MEROPS: C44
- SCOP2: 1fkm / SCOPe / SUPFAM
- TCDB: 4.A.6
- CAZy: GT16
Available protein structures:
- Pfam: structures / ECOD
- PDB: RCSB PDB; PDBe; PDBj
- PDBsum: structure summary

In molecular biology, the GA module, or protein G-related albumin-binding module, is a protein domain which occurs on the surface of numerous Gram-positive bacterial pathogens. Protein G of group C and G Streptococci interacts with the constant region of IgG and with human serum albumin. The GA module is composed of a left-handed three-helix bundle and is found in a range of bacterial cell surface proteins. GA modules may promote bacterial growth and virulence in mammalian hosts by scavenging albumin-bound nutrients and camouflaging the bacteria. Variations in sequence give rise to differences in structure and function between GA modules in different proteins, which could alter pathogenesis and host specificity due to their varied affinities for different species of albumin. Proteins containing a GA module include PAB from Peptostreptococcus magnus.
