= Protein K =

Protein K may refer to:

- Protein K (porin), a porin expressed in pathogenic strains of E. coli
- Protein K (gene expression), a DNA- and RNA-binding protein expressed in the nucleus of eukaryotes
