= Protein quinary structure =

Protein quinary structure refers to the features of protein surfaces that are shaped by evolutionary adaptation to the physiological context of living cells. Quinary structure is thus the fifth level of protein complexity, additional to protein primary, secondary, tertiary and quaternary structures. As opposed to the first four levels of protein structure, which are relevant to isolated proteins in dilute conditions, quinary structure emerges from the crowdedness of the cellular context, in which transient encounters among macromolecules are constantly occurring.

In order to perform their functions, proteins often need to find a specific counterpart to which they will bind in a relatively long encounter. In a very crowded cytosol, in which proteins engage in a vast and complex network of attracting and repelling interactions, such search becomes challenging, because it involves sampling a huge space of possible partners, of which very few will be productive. A solution to this challenge requires that proteins spend as little time as possible on each encounter, so that they can explore a larger number of surfaces, while simultaneously making this interaction as intimate as possible, so if they do come across the right partner, they will not miss it. In this sense, quinary structure is the result of a series of adaptations present in protein surfaces, which allow proteins to navigate the complexity of the cellular environment.

== Early observations ==
With the sense with which it is used today, the term quinary structure first appeared in the work of McConkey, in 1989. In his work, McConkey runs 2D electrophoresis gels on the total protein content of hamster (CHO) and human (HeLa) cells. In a 2D electrophoresis gel experiment, the coordinates of a protein depend on its molecular weight and its isoelectric point. Given the evolutionary distance between humans and hamsters, and considering evolutionary rates typical of mammals, one would expect a large number of substitutions to have occurred between hamsters and humans, a fraction of which would involve acidic (aspartate and glutamate) and basic (arginine and lysine) residues, resulting in changes in the isoelectric point of many proteins. Strikingly, hamster and human cells yielded almost identical fingerprints in the experiment, implying that many fewer of those substitutions actually took place. McConkey suggested in that paper that the reason why the proteins of humans and hamsters had not diverged as much he anticipated was that an additional selective pressure must have been related to the many non-specific "interactions that are inherently transient" experienced by proteins in the cytoplasm and which "constitute the fifth level of protein organization".

== Protein interactions and quinary structure ==
Despite the crudeness of McConkey's experiment, his interpretation of the results have proved to be accurate. Rather than simply being hydrophilic, protein surfaces must have carefully been modulated by evolution and adapted to this network of weak interactions, often called quinary interactions. Protein-protein interactions responsible for the emergence of quinary structure are fundamentally different from specific protein encounters. The latter are the result of relatively high-stability binding, often linked to functionally meaningful events –many of which have already been described – while the former are often interpreted as some background noise of physiologically unproductive misinteractions that complicate the interpretation of protein networks and need to be avoided, so that normal cellular functions can proceed.

The transient nature of these protein encounters complicates the study of quinary structure. Indeed, the interactions responsible for this upper level of protein organisation are weak and short-lived, and hence would not produce protein-protein complexes that could be isolated by conventional biochemical methods. Therefore, quinary structure can only be understood in vivo.

== In-cell NMR and quinary structure ==
In-cell NMR is an experimental technique prominent in the research field of protein quinary structure. The physical principle of in-cell NMR measurements is identical to that of conventional protein NMR, but the experiments rely on expressing high concentrations of the probe protein, which should remain soluble and contained in the cellular space; which introduces additional difficulties and limitations. However, these experiments provide critical insights about the cross-talk between a probe protein and the intracellular environment.

Early attempts at using in-cell NMR to study protein quinary structure were hindered by a limitation caused by the very phenomenon they were trying to understand. Many probe proteins tested in these experiments turned out to produce broad signals, near the detection limit of the method, when measured inside cells of Escherichia coli. In particular, these proteins seemed to tumble as if they had molecular weights much larger than those corresponding to their size. These observations seemed to indicate that the proteins were sticking to other macromolecules, which would have led to poor relaxation properties

Other in-cell NMR experiments showed that single amino acid changes of surface residues could be used to consistently modulate the tumbling of three different proteins inside bacterial cells. Charged and hydrophobic residues were shown to have the largest impact in protein intracellular mobility. In particular, more negatively charged proteins would tumble faster in comparison with near-null or positively charged proteins. In contrast, the presence of many hydrophobic residues in the protein surface would slow down protein intracellular tumbling. Protein dipole moment, a measure of charge separation across the protein, was shown to have a significant contribution to protein mobility, where high dipole moments would correlate with slower tumbling. This interpretation is most straightforward for proteins considered at or near their isoelectric point; care must be exercised at other pH values, since once the protein bears a net charge, the dipole moment becomes non-unique and dependent on the coordinate system used to define the structure.
