= Periodic counter-current chromatography =

Periodic counter-current chromatography (PCC) is a method for running affinity chromatography in a quasi-continuous manner. Today, the process is mainly employed for the purification of antibodies in the biopharmaceutical industry as well as in research and development. When purifying antibodies, protein A is used as affinity matrix. However, periodic counter-current processes can be applied to any affinity type chromatography.

== Basic principle ==
In conventional affinity chromatography, a single chromatography column is loaded with feed material up to the point before target material (product) cannot be retained by the affinity material anymore. The resin with the adsorbed product on it is then washed to remove impurities. Finally, the pure product is eluted with a different buffer. Notably, if too much feed material is loaded onto the column, the product can break through and product is consequently lost. Therefore, it is very important to only partially load the column to maximize the yield.

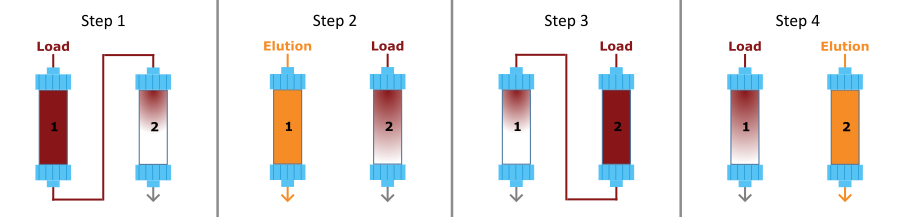
Process diagram for the 2-column periodic counter-current process "CaptureSMB".

Periodic counter-current chromatography puts this problem aside by utilizing more than one column. PCC processes can be run with any number of columns, starting from two. The following paragraph will explain a two-column version of PCC, but other protocols with more columns rely on the same principles (see below). A diagram depicting the individual process steps is shown on the right. In Step 1, the so-called sequential loading phase, columns 1 and 2 are interconnected. Column 1 is fully loaded with sample (red) while its breakthrough is captured on column 2. In Step 2, column 1 is washed, eluted, cleaned and re-equilibrated while loading separately continues on column 2. In Step 3, after regeneration of column 1, the columns are again inter-connected and column 2 is fully loaded while its breakthrough is captured on column 1. Finally, in Step 4 column 2 is washed, eluted, cleaned and re-equilibrated while loading continues independently on column 1. This cyclic process is repeated in a continuous way.

Several variations of periodic counter-current chromatography with more than two columns exist. In these cases, additional columns are either placed within the feed stream during loading, having the same effect as using longer columns. Alternatively, additional columns can be kept in an unoccupied stand-by mode during loading. This mode offers additional assurance that the main process is not influenced by washing and cleaning protocols, albeit in practice this is rarely required. On the other hand, the underutilized columns reduce the theoretical maximum productivity for such processes. Generally, the advantages and disadvantages of different multi-column protocols are the subject of debate. However, without a doubt, compared to single column batch processes, periodic counter-current processes provide significantly increased productivity.

== Dynamic process control ==
Dynamic process control mechanisms for periodic counter-current chromatography.

On the time scale of continuous chromatography runs, it is fairly common to observe changes in important process parameters, such as column health, buffer quality, feed titer (concentration) or feed composition. Such changes result in an altered maximum column capacity, relative to the amount of loaded feed material. In order to achieve a steady quality and yield for each process cycle, the timing of the individual process steps therefore has to be adjusted. Manual changes are in principle conceivable, but rather impractical. More commonly, dynamic process control algorithms monitor the process parameters and apply changes as needed automatically.

There are two different operating modes for dynamic process controllers in use today (see Figure on the right). The first one, called DeltaUV, monitors the difference between two signals from detectors situated before and after the first column. During initial loading, there is a large difference between the two signals, but it is diminishing as the impurities make their way through the column. Once the column is fully saturated with impurities and only additional product is being held back, the difference between the signals reaches a constant value. As long as the product is completely being captured on the column, the difference between the signals will remain constant. As soon as some of the product breaks through the column (compare above), the difference diminishes. Thus, the timing and amount of product breakthrough can be determined. The second possibility, called AutomAb, requires only the signal of a single detector situated behind the first column. During initial loading, the signal increases, as more and more impurities make their way through the column. When the column is saturated with impurities and as long as the product is completely being captured on the column, the signal then remains constant. As soon as some of the product breaks through the column (compare above), the signal increases again. Thus, the timing and amount of product breakthrough can again be determined.

Both iterations work equally well in theory. In practice, the requirement for two synced signals and the exposure of one detector to unpurified feed material, makes the DetaUV approach less reliable than AutomAb.

== Commercial situation ==
As of 2017, Cytiva holds patents around three-column periodic counter-current chromatography: this technology is used in their Äkta PCC instrument. Likewise, ChromaCon holds patents for an optimized two-column version (CaptureSMB). CaptureSMB is used in ChromaCon's Contichrom CUBE and under license in YMC's Ecoprime Twin systems. Additional manufacturers of systems capable of periodic counter-current chromatography include Novasep and Pall.
