= Deproteination =

Technique in research of live materials

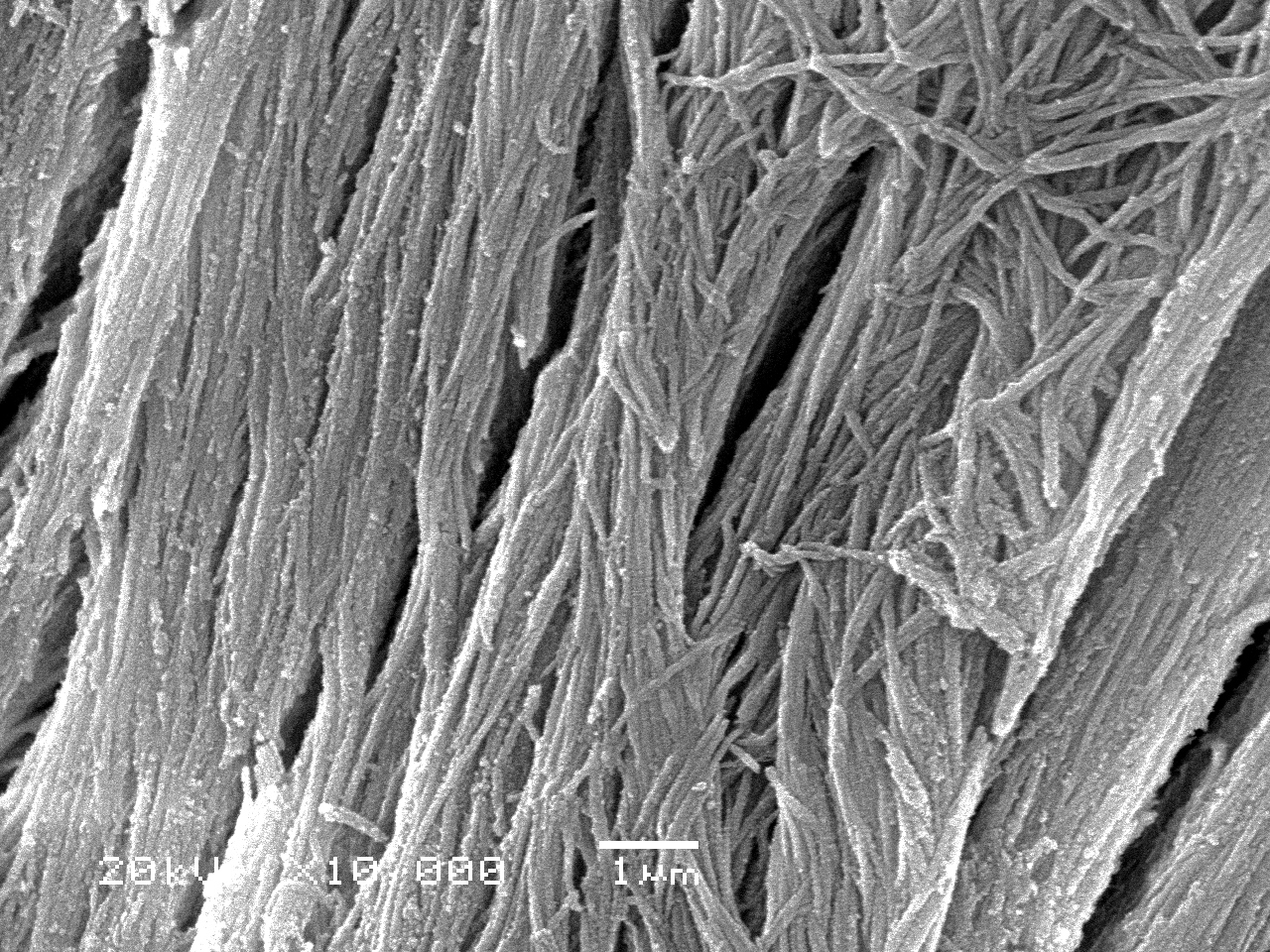
Scanning Electronic micrography 10000 magnification of Bone mineral

Deproteination is the process of eliminating protein from some living materials. This procedure is particularly common in studies on the inorganic part of bone, teeth and shells.

Several different methods can be used for deproteination, such as the method that uses hydrazine, the method that uses NaOH and the method that uses enzymes.
