= Protein A/G =

Protein A/G is a recombinant fusion protein that combines IgG binding domains of both protein A and protein G. Protein A/G contains four Fc binding domains from protein A and two from protein G, yielding a final mass of 50,460 daltons. The binding of protein A/G is less pH-dependent than protein A, but otherwise has the additive properties of protein A and G.

Protein A/G binds to all subclasses of human IgG, making it useful for purifying polyclonal or monoclonal IgG antibodies whose subclasses have not been determined. In addition, it binds to IgA, IgE, IgM and (to a lesser extent) IgD. Protein A/G also binds to all subclasses of mouse IgG but does not bind mouse IgA, IgM or serum albumin. This allows Protein A/G to be used for purification and detection of mouse monoclonal IgG antibodies, without interference from IgA, IgM and serum albumin. Mouse monoclonal antibodies commonly have a stronger affinity to the chimeric protein A/G than to either protein A or protein G. Protein A/G also has been used for purification of macaque IgG.

== Other antibody binding proteins ==
In addition to protein A/G, other immunoglobulin-binding bacterial proteins such as protein A, protein G and protein L are all commonly used to purify, immobilize or detect immunoglobulins. Each of these immunoglobulin-binding proteins has a different antibody binding profile in terms of the portion of the antibody that is recognized and the species and type of antibodies.
