= Protein K (porin) =

== Structure ==
Proteinase K has a catalytic triad of Ser 224, His 69, and Asp 39. Two peptide chains recognize substrates, 99-104 and 132–136. There is also a cysteine free near His 69.

Protein K is a porin expressed in some pathogenic strains of E. coli bacteria. It has a molecular weight of about 40 kDa and is localized to the outer membrane, through which it allows both inorganic and organic ions to pass. The addition of Protein K in the outer membrane proven to cause an increased rate of uptake of nutrients and a faster growth rate relative to the parental porin- strain.

The strains in which protein K has been identified are encapsulated, or surrounded by a poly-sialic acid capsule that renders them more resistant to phagocytosis by cells in the immune system.
