= Protein L =

Protein L b1 domain
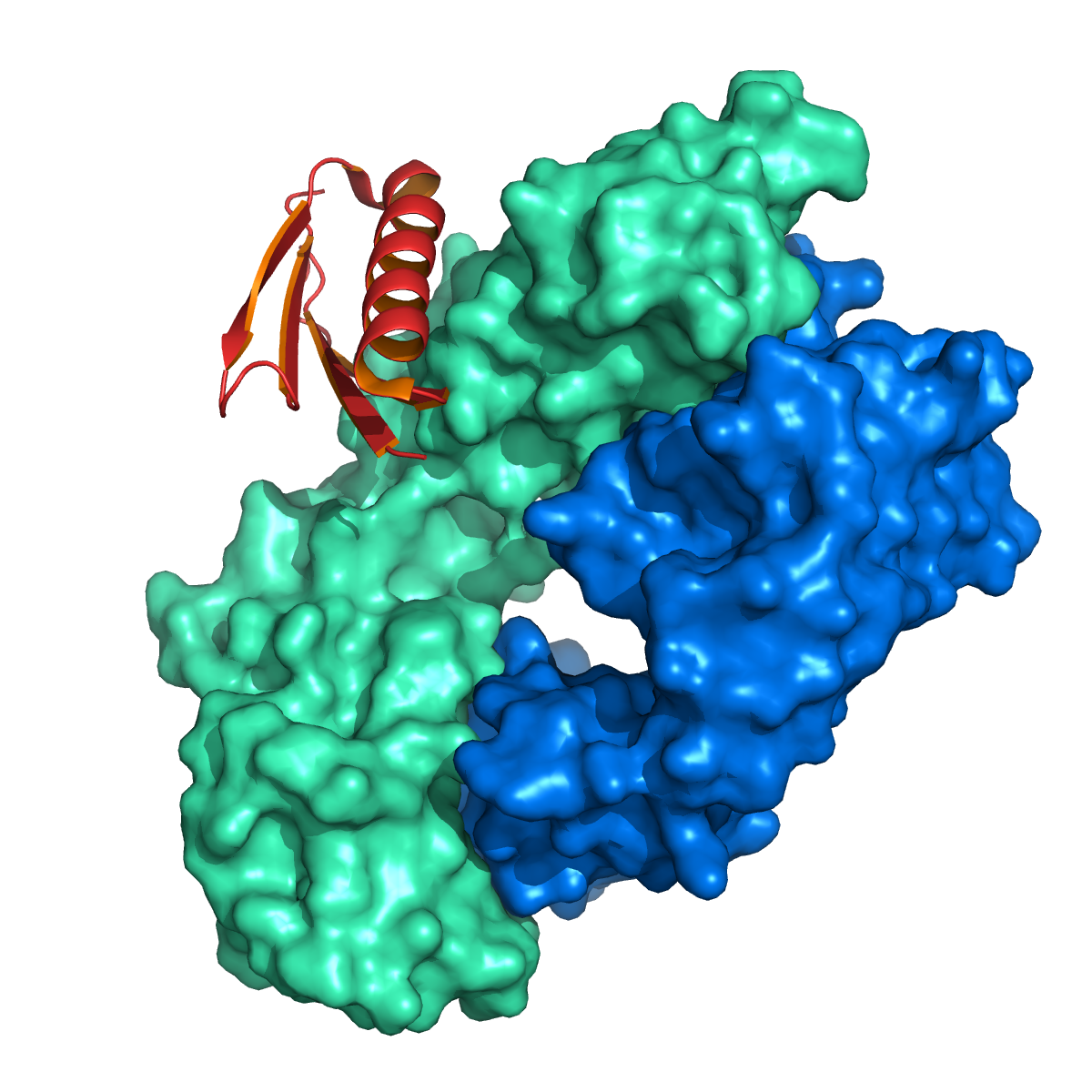
- Structure of protein L binding to the light chain of a murine Fab (PDB: 1MHH).

Identifiers
- Symbol: PpL
- Pfam: PF02246
- InterPro: IPR003147
- SCOP2: 1MHH / SCOPe / SUPFAM
Available protein structures:
- PDB: 1mhh, 1xcq, 1xct, 1hez, 1ynt, 1xf5, 1ymh, 1k52, 1k50, 1hz5, 1hz6, 1k51, 1k53, 2ptl, 2jzp, 2kac, 1jml, 1kh0 IPR003147 PF02246 (ECOD; PDBsum)
- AlphaFold: IPR003147; PF02246

Protein L was first isolated from the surface of bacterial species Peptostreptococcus magnus and was found to bind immunoglobulins through L chain interaction, from which the name was suggested. It consists of 719 amino acid residues. The molecular weight of protein L purified from the cell walls of Peptostreptoccus magnus was first estimated as 95kD by SDS-PAGE in the presence of reducing agent 2-mercaptoethanol, while the molecular weight was determined to 76kD by gel chromatography in the presence of 6 M guanidine HCl. Protein L does not contain any interchain disulfide loops, nor does it consist of disulfide-linked subunits. It is an acidic molecule with a pI of 4.0. Unlike protein A and protein G, which bind to the Fc region of immunoglobulins (antibodies), protein L binds antibodies through light chain interactions. Since no part of the heavy chain is involved in the binding interaction, Protein L binds a wider range of antibody classes than protein A or G. Protein L binds to representatives of all antibody classes, including IgG, IgM, IgA, IgE and IgD. Single chain variable fragments (scFv) and Fab fragments also bind to protein L.

Despite this wide binding range, protein L is not a universal antibody-binding protein. Protein L binding is restricted to those antibodies that contain kappa light chains. In humans and mice, most antibody molecules contain kappa (κ) light chains and the remainder have lambda (λ) light chains. Protein L is only effective in binding certain subtypes of kappa light chains. For example, it binds human VκI, VκIII and VκIV subtypes but does not bind the VκII subtype. Binding of mouse immunoglobulins is restricted to those having VκI light chains.

Given these specific requirements for effective binding, the main application for immobilized protein L is purification of monoclonal antibodies from ascites or cell culture supernatant that are known to have the kappa light chain. Protein L is extremely useful for purification of VLκ-containing monoclonal antibodies from culture supernatant because it does not bind bovine immunoglobulins, which are often present in the media as a serum supplement. Also, protein L does not interfere with the antigen-binding site of the antibody, making it useful for immunoprecipitation assays, even using IgM.

== Gene for protein L ==
The gene for protein L contains five components: a signal sequence of 18 amino acids; a NH2-terminal region ("A") of 79 residues; five homologous "B" repeats of 72-76 amino acids each; a COOH terminus region of two additional "C" repeats (52 amino acids each); a hydrophilic, proline-rich putative cell wall-spanning region ("W") after the C repeats; a hydrophobic membrane anchor ("M"). The B repeats (36kD) were found to be responsible for the interaction with Ig light chains.^{[2]}

== Other antibody binding proteins ==
In addition to protein L, other immunoglobulin-binding bacterial proteins such as protein A, protein G and protein A/G are all commonly used to purify, immobilize or detect immunoglobulins. Each of these immunoglobulin-binding proteins has a different antibody binding profile in terms of the portion of the antibody that is recognized and the species and type of antibodies it will bind.
