= Protein A =

Surface protein in bacteria cell walls

Protein A, Ig-binding domain
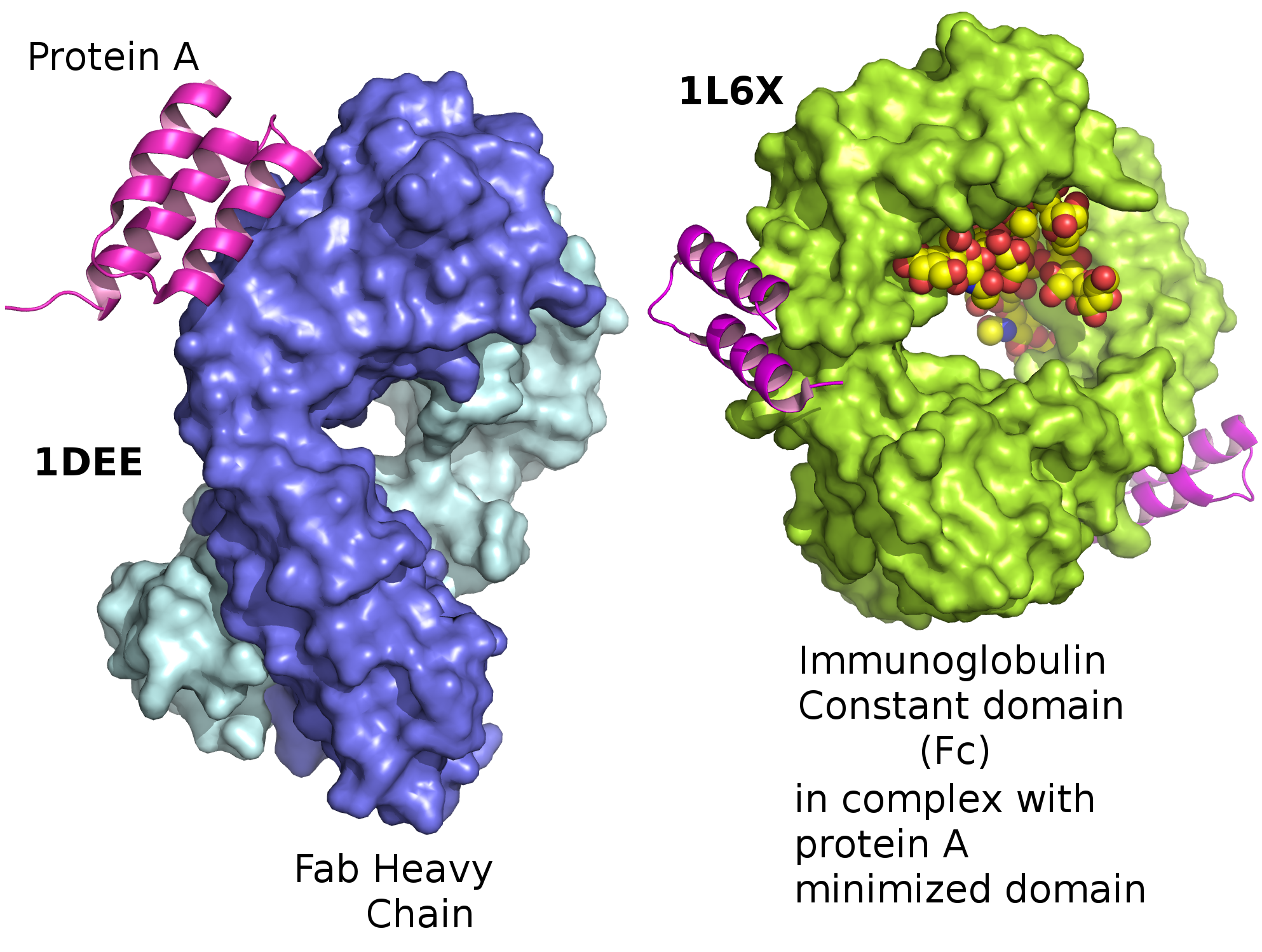
- Structure of a domain of protein A as a three-helix bundle binding to the heavy variable chain of a VH3 human Fab (left). Minimized protein A bound to Fc fragment of Rituximab (right). Uniprot P02976.

Identifiers
- Symbol: SpA
- Pfam: PF02216
- InterPro: IPR003132
- SCOP2: 1DEE / SCOPe / SUPFAM
Available protein structures:
- PDB: 1dee, 1l6x IPR003132 PF02216 (ECOD; PDBsum)
- AlphaFold: IPR003132; PF02216

Protein A is a 42 kDa surface protein originally found in the cell wall of the bacteria Staphylococcus aureus. It is encoded by the spa gene and its regulation is controlled by DNA topology, cellular osmolarity, and a two-component system called ArlS-ArlR. It has found use in biochemical research because of its ability to bind immunoglobulins. It is composed of five homologous Ig-binding domains that fold into a three-helix bundle. Each domain is able to bind proteins from many mammalian species, most notably IgGs. It binds the heavy chain within the Fc region of most immunoglobulins and also within the Fab region in the case of the human VH3 family. Through these interactions in serum, where IgG molecules are bound in the wrong orientation (in relation to normal antibody function), the bacteria disrupts opsonization and phagocytosis.

== History ==
As a by-product of his work on type-specific staphylococcus antigens, Verwey reported in 1940 that a protein fraction prepared from extracts of these bacteria non-specifically precipitated rabbit antisera raised against different staphylococcus types. In 1958, Jensen confirmed Verwey's finding and showed that rabbit pre-immunization sera as well as normal human sera bound to the active component in the staphylococcus extract; he designated this component Antigen A (because it was found in fraction A of the extract) but thought it was a polysaccharide. The misclassification of the protein was the result of faulty tests, but it was not long thereafter (1962) that Löfkvist and Sjöquist corrected the error and confirmed that Antigen A was in fact a surface protein on the bacterial wall of certain strains of S. aureus. The Bergen group from Norway named the protein "Protein A" after the antigen fraction isolated by Jensen.

== Protein A antibody binding ==
It has been shown via crystallographic refinement that the primary binding site for protein A is on the Fc region, between the C_{H}2 and C_{H}3 domains. In addition, protein A has been shown to bind human IgG molecules containing IgG F(ab')2 fragments from the human VH3 gene family.

Protein A can bind with strong affinity to the Fc portion of immunoglobulin of certain species as shown in the below table.

| Species | Subclass | Binding |
|---|---|---|
| Human | IgA | variable |
| | IgD | weak or none |
| | IgE | weak or none |
| | IgG_{1} | strong |
| | IgG_{2} | strong |
| | IgG_{3} | weak or none |
| | IgG_{4} | strong |
| | IgM | variable |
| Avian egg yolk | IgY | weak or none |
| Bovine | | medium |
| Canine | | medium |
| Goat | | weak or none |
| Guinea pig | IgG_{1} | strong |
| Hamster | | weak |
| Horse | | medium |
| Koala | | weak or none |
| Llama | | weak or none |
| Monkey (rhesus) | | strong |
| Murine | IgG_{1} | weak |
| | IgG_{2a} | strong |
| | IgG_{2} | medium to strong |
| | IgG_{3} | medium |
| | IgM | variable |
| Pig | | medium to strong |
| Rabbit | | strong |
| Rat | IgG_{1} | weak or none |
| | IgG_{2a} | weak or none |
| | IgG_{2b} | weak or none |
| | IgG_{3} | weak |
| Sheep | | weak or none |

== Other antibody binding proteins ==
In addition to protein A, other immunoglobulin-binding bacterial proteins such as protein G, protein A/G and protein L are all commonly used to purify, immobilize or detect immunoglobulins.

== Role in pathogenesis ==
As a pathogen, Staphylococcus aureus utilizes protein A, along with a host of other proteins and surface factors, to aid its survival and virulence. To this end, protein A plays a multifaceted role:

1. By binding the Fc portion of antibodies, protein A renders them inaccessible to the opsonins, thus impairing phagocytosis of the bacteria via immune cell attack.
2. Protein A facilitates the adherence of S. aureus to human von Willebrand factor (vWF)-coated surfaces, thus increasing the bacteria's infectiousness at the site of skin penetration.
3. Protein A can inflame lung tissue by binding to tumor necrosis factor 1 (TNFR-1) receptors. This interaction has been shown to play a key role in the pathogenesis of staphylococcal pneumonia.
4. Protein A has been shown to cripple humoral (antibody-mediated) immunity which in turn means that individuals can be repeatedly infected with S. aureus since they cannot mount a strong antibody response.
5. Protein A has been shown to promote the formation of biofilms both when the protein is covalently linked to the bacterial cell wall as well as in solution.

Protein A helps inhibit phagocytic engulfment and acts as an immunological disguise. Higher levels of protein A in different strains of S. aureus have been associated with nasal carriage of this bacteria.

Mutants of S. aureus lacking protein A are more efficiently phagocytosed in vitro, and mutants in infection models have diminished virulence.

== Production ==
Protein A is produced and purified in industrial fermentation for use in immunology, biological research and industrial applications (see below). Natural (or native) protein A can be cultured in Staphylococcus aureus and contains the five homologous antibody binding regions described above and a C-terminal region for cell wall attachment. Today, protein A is more commonly produced recombinantly in Escherichia coli. (Brevibacillus has also been shown to be an effective host.) Recombinant versions of protein A also contain the five homologous antibody binding domains but may vary in other parts of the structure in order to facilitate coupling to porous substrates. Engineered versions of the protein are also available, the first of which was rProtein A, B4, C-CYS. Engineered versions are multimers (typically tetramers, pentamers or hexamers) of a single domain which has been modified to improve usability in industrial applications.

== Research ==
Protein A is often coupled to other molecules such as a fluorescent dye, enzymes, biotin, colloidal gold or radioactive iodine without affecting the antibody binding site. Examples including protein A–gold (PAG) stain is used in immunogold labelling, fluorophore coupled protein A for immunofluorescence, and DNA docking strand coupled protein A for DNA-PAINT imaging. It is also widely utilized coupled to magnetic, latex and agarose beads.

Protein A is often immobilized onto a solid support and used as reliable method for purifying total IgG from crude protein mixtures such as serum or ascites fluid, or coupled with one of the above markers to detect the presence of antibodies. The first example of protein A being coupled to a porous bead for purification of IgG was published in 1972. Immunoprecipitation studies with protein A conjugated to beads are also commonly used to purify proteins or protein complexes indirectly through antibodies against the protein or protein complex of interest.

== Role in industrial purification of antibodies ==
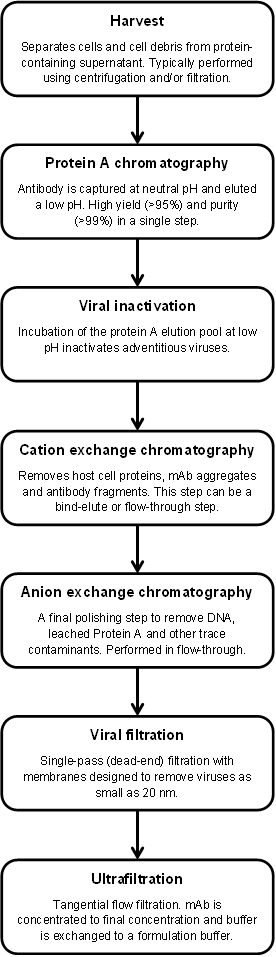
This process flow diagram shows how monoclonal antibodies are typically purified at industrial scale.

The first reference in the literature to a commercially available protein A chromatography resin appeared in 1976. Today, chromatographic separation using protein A immobilized on porous substrates is the most widely established method for purifying monoclonal antibodies (mAbs) from harvest cell culture supernatant. The choice of protein A as the preferred method is due to the high purity and yield which are easily and reliably achieved. This forms the basis for a general antibody purification "platform" which simplifies manufacturing operations and reduces the time and effort required to develop purification processes. A typical mAb purification process is shown at right. Albeit the long history of protein A chromatography for the production of antibodies, the process is still being improved today. Continuous chromatography, more precisely periodic counter-current chromatography, enormously increases the productivity of the purification step.
