= Protein G =

Immunoglobulin-binding protein expressed in group C and G Streptococcal bacteria

GA-like domain

Identifiers
- Symbol: ?
- Pfam: PF17573
- InterPro: IPR035152
Available protein structures:
- Pfam: structures / ECOD
- PDB: RCSB PDB; PDBe; PDBj
- PDBsum: structure summary

Immunoglobulin G-binding protein G

Identifiers
- Organism: Streptococcus sp. group G
- Symbol: spg
- UniProt: P06654
Search for
- Structures: Swiss-model
- Domains: InterPro

Protein G is an immunoglobulin-binding protein expressed in group C and G streptococcal bacteria much like protein A but with differing binding specificities. It is a ~60-kDA (65 kDA for strain G148 and 58 kDa for strain C40) cell surface protein that has found application in purifying antibodies through its binding to the Fab and Fc region. The native molecule also binds albumin, but because serum albumin is a major contaminant of antibody sources, the albumin binding site has been removed from recombinant forms of protein G. This recombinant protein G, either labeled with a fluorophore or a single-stranded DNA strand, was used as a replacement for secondary antibodies in immunofluorescence and super-resolution imaging.

== Other antibody binding proteins ==
In addition to protein G, other immunoglobulin-binding bacterial proteins such as protein A, protein A/G and protein L are all commonly used to purify, immobilize or detect immunoglobulins. Each of these immunoglobulin-binding proteins has a different antibody binding profile in terms of the portion of the antibody that is recognized and the species and type of antibodies it will bind.

== Folding of protein G, B1 domain ==
An ab initio simulation of the protein G B1 domain demonstrates that, as earlier results suggested, this protein initiates folding via a nucleation event in the hydrophobic core residues followed by small adjustments. The folding events are as follows:

1. a β-hairpin is formed, stabilized by residues W43, Y45, and F52.
2. Residue contacts between residue F30, in an α-helix, and the β-hairpin strengthen.
3. Nucleation of the β-sheet starting from residues L5 and F52, occurs.
4. The last nucleation residue, Y3, assists in forming the central part of the β-sheet resulting in a globular protein.

The protein G B1 domain (aka. GB1) is often used as part of a fusion protein to keep other domains in solution during experiments in solution (e.g. NMR). Many previously insoluble domains have become soluble with the fusion of the GB1 domain. The domain is 56 residues (approx 8kDa) long. On SDS-PAGE gels the GB1 domain runs at roughly 13.5kDa despite being only 8kDa.

== See also ==
- GA module
