= Conformational epitope =

Segment of a molecule which contacts an immune receptor when folded

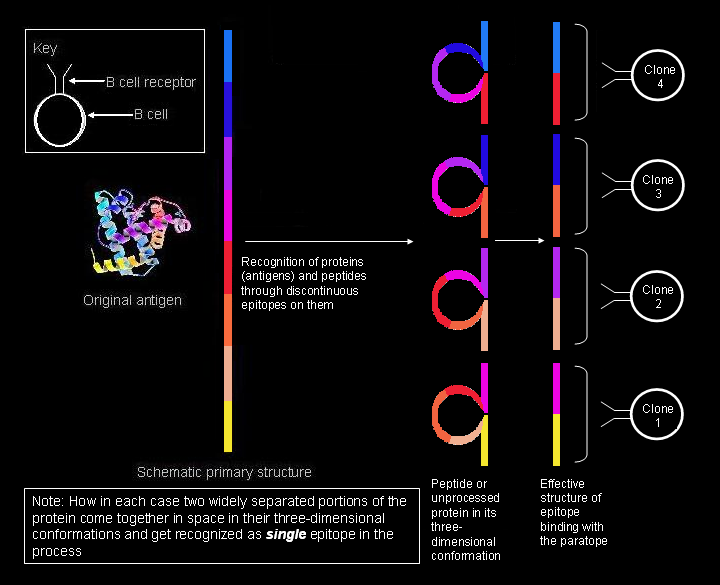
Recognition of conformational epitopes by B cells. Note how the segments widely separated in the primary structure have come in contact in the three-dimensional tertiary structure forming part of the same epitope

In immunology, a conformational epitope is a sequence of sub-units (usually amino acids) composing an antigen that come in direct contact with a receptor of the immune system.

An antigen is any substance that the immune system can recognize as foreign. Antigens are usually proteins that are too large to bind as a whole to any receptor so only specific segments, that form the antigen, bind with a specific receptor. Such segments are called epitopes. Likewise, it is only the paratope of the receptor that comes in contact with the epitope.

Proteins are composed of repeating nitrogen-containing subunits called amino acids that in nature do not exist as straight chains but as folded whorls with complex loops. The latter is known as the tertiary structure of a protein. So, whenever a receptor interacts with an undigested antigen, the surface amino acids that come in contact may not be continuous with each other if the protein is unwound. Such discontinuous amino acids that come together in three-dimensional conformation and interact with the receptor's paratope are called conformational epitopes. In contrast, if the antigen is digested, small segments called peptides are formed, which bind with major histocompatibility complex molecules, and then later with T cell receptors through amino acids that are continuous in a line. These are known as linear epitopes.

== See also ==
- Antigen
- Linear epitope
- Epitope mapping, finding (on an antigen protein) the epitope(s) for a specific antibody
