= Epitope mapping =

Identifying the binding site of an antibody on its target antigen

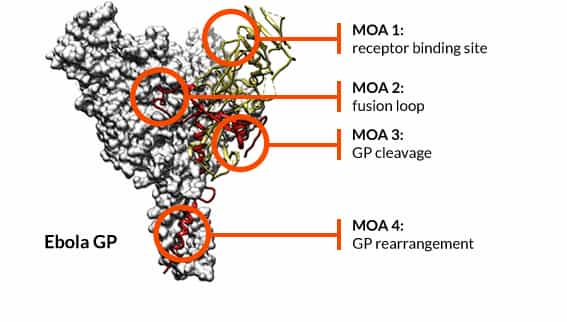
High-resolution epitope maps of antibodies against Ebola glycoprotein (GP), determined using shotgun mutagenesis epitope mapping. Epitope maps provide data for determining mechanism of action (MOA).

In immunology, epitope mapping is the process of experimentally identifying the binding site, or epitope, of an antibody on its target antigen (usually, on a protein). Identification and characterization of antibody binding sites aid in the discovery and development of new therapeutics, vaccines, and diagnostics. Epitope characterization can also help elucidate the binding mechanism of an antibody and can strengthen intellectual property (patent) protection. Experimental epitope mapping data can be incorporated into robust algorithms to facilitate in silico prediction of B-cell epitopes based on sequence and/or structural data.

Epitopes are generally divided into two classes: linear and conformational/discontinuous. Linear epitopes are formed by a continuous sequence of amino acids in a protein. Conformational epitopes epitopes are formed by amino acids that are nearby in the folded 3D structure but distant in the protein sequence. Note that conformational epitopes can include some linear segments. B-cell epitope mapping studies suggest that most interactions between antigens and antibodies, particularly autoantibodies and protective antibodies (e.g., in vaccines), rely on binding to discontinuous epitopes.

== Importance for antibody characterization ==
By providing information on mechanism of action, epitope mapping is a critical component in therapeutic monoclonal antibody (mAb) development. Epitope mapping can reveal how a mAb exerts its functional effects - for instance, by blocking the binding of a ligand or by trapping a protein in a non-functional state. Many therapeutic mAbs target conformational epitopes that are only present when the protein is in its native (properly folded) state, which can make epitope mapping challenging. Epitope mapping has been crucial to the development of vaccines against prevalent or deadly viral pathogens, such as chikungunya, dengue, Ebola, and Zika viruses, by determining the antigenic elements (epitopes) that confer long-lasting immunization effects.

Complex target antigens, such as membrane proteins (e.g., G protein-coupled receptors [GPCRs]) and multi-subunit proteins (e.g., ion channels) are key targets of drug discovery. Mapping epitopes on these targets can be challenging because of the difficulty in expressing and purifying these complex proteins. Membrane proteins frequently have short antigenic regions (epitopes) that fold correctly only when in the context of a lipid bilayer. As a result, mAb epitopes on these membrane proteins are often conformational and, therefore, are more difficult to map.

== Importance for intellectual property (IP) protection ==
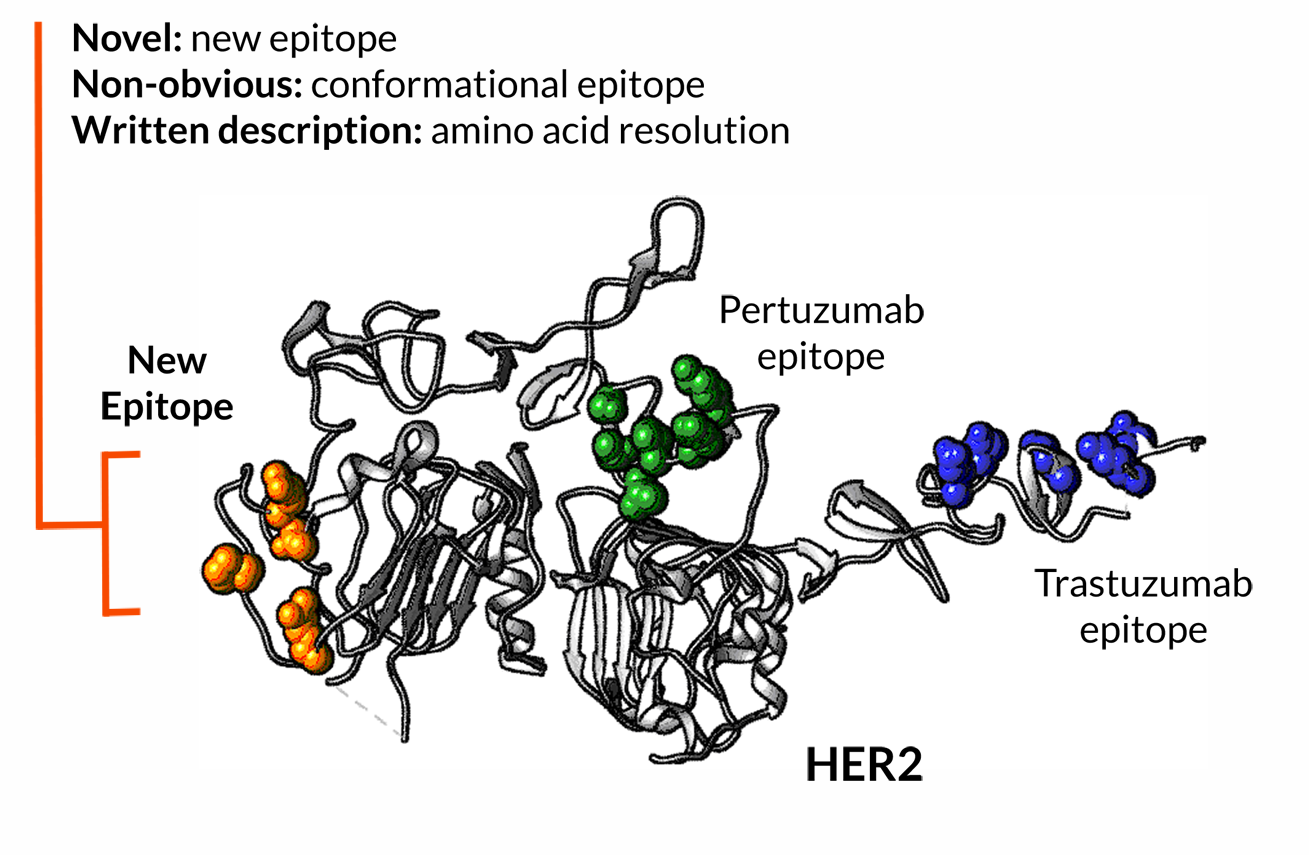
Shotgun mutagenesis epitope mapping of antibodies against HER2 revealed a novel epitope (orange spheres). Epitope maps provide supporting data for intellectual property (patent) claims.

Epitope mapping has become prevalent in protecting the intellectual property (IP) of therapeutic mAbs. Knowledge of the specific binding sites of antibodies strengthens patents and regulatory submissions by distinguishing between current and prior art (existing) antibodies. The ability to differentiate between antibodies is particularly important when patenting antibodies against well-validated therapeutic targets (e.g., PD1 and CD20) that can be drugged by multiple competing antibodies. In addition to verifying antibody patentability, epitope mapping data have been used to support broad antibody claims submitted to the United States Patent and Trademark Office.

Epitope data have been central to several high-profile legal cases involving disputes over the specific protein regions targeted by therapeutic antibodies. In this regard, the Amgen v. Sanofi/Regeneron Pharmaceuticals PCSK9 inhibitor case hinged on the ability to show that both the Amgen and Sanofi/Regeneron therapeutic antibodies bound to overlapping amino acids on the surface of PCSK9.

== Methods ==
There are several methods available for mapping antibody epitopes on target antigens:

- X-ray co-crystallography and cryogenic electron microscopy (cryo-EM). X-ray co-crystallography has historically been regarded as the gold-standard approach for epitope mapping because it allows direct visualization of the interaction between the antigen and antibody. Cryo-EM can similarly provide high-resolution maps of antibody-antigen interactions. However, both approaches are technically challenging, time-consuming, and expensive, and not all proteins are amenable to crystallization. Moreover, these techniques are not always feasible due to the difficulty in obtaining sufficient quantities of correctly folded and processed protein. Finally, neither technique can distinguish key epitope residues (energetic "hot spots") for mAbs that bind to the same group of amino acids.
- Array-based oligopeptide scanning. Also known as overlapping peptide scan or pepscan analysis, this technique uses a library of oligopeptide sequences from overlapping and non-overlapping segments of a target protein, and tests for their ability to bind the antibody of interest. This method is fast, relatively inexpensive, and specifically suited to profile epitopes for large numbers of candidate antibodies against a defined target. The epitope mapping resolution depends on the number of overlapping peptides that are used. The main disadvantage of this approach is that discontinuous epitopes are deconstructed into smaller peptides, which can cause lower binding affinities. However, advances have been made with technologies such as constrained peptides, which can be used to mimic conformational as well as discontinuous epitopes. For example, an antibody against CD20 was mapped in a study using array-based oligopeptide scanning, by combining non-adjacent peptide sequences from different parts of the target protein and enforcing conformational rigidity onto this combined peptide (e.g., by using CLIPS scaffolds). Replacement analysis on peptides also allows single amino acid resolution, and can therefore pinpoint key epitope residues.
- Site-directed mutagenesis mapping. The molecular biological technique of site-directed mutagenesis (SDM) can be used to enable epitope mapping. In SDM, systematic mutations of amino acids are introduced into the sequence of the target protein. Binding of an antibody to each mutated protein is tested to identify the amino acids that comprise the epitope. This technique can be used to map both linear and conformational epitopes but is labor-intensive and time-consuming, typically limiting analysis to a small number of amino-acid residues.
- High-throughput shotgun mutagenesis epitope mapping. Shotgun mutagenesis is a high-throughput approach for mapping the epitopes of mAbs. The shotgun mutagenesis technique begins with the creation of a mutation library of the entire target antigen, with each clone containing a unique amino acid mutation (typically an alanine substitution). Hundreds of plasmid clones from the library are individually arrayed in 384-well microplates, expressed in human cells, and tested for antibody binding. Amino acids of the target required for antibody binding are identified by a loss of immunoreactivity. These residues are mapped onto structures of the target protein to visualize the epitope. Benefits of high-throughput shotgun mutagenesis epitope mapping include: 1) the ability to identify both linear and conformational epitopes, 2) a shorter assay time than other methods, 3) the presentation of properly folded and post-translationally modified proteins, and 4) the ability to identify key amino acids that drive the energetic interactions (energetic "hot spots" of the epitope). However, for conformational epitopes where a large interface is involved in the binding, as is the case with most therapeutic antibodies, mutation of one residue does not necessarily result in apparent change in the total binding affinity. These epitope residues may be missed by this method.
- Hydrogen–deuterium exchange (HDX). This method gives information about the solvent accessibility of various parts of the antigen and antibody, demonstrating reduced solvent accessibility in regions of protein-protein interactions. One of its advantages is that it determines the interaction site of the antigen-antibody complex in its native solution, and does not introduce any modifications (e.g. mutation) to either the antigen or the antibody. HDX epitope mapping has also been demonstrated to be the effective method to rapidly supply complete information for epitope structure. The traditional bottom-up HDX-MS approach does not usually provide data at the level of amino acid, but this limitation has now been overcome by HDX FineMapping using newer middle-down approach. The binding epitope of Pembrolizumab (Keytruda) on PD1 is successfully determined by this method with single amino acid resolution (https://www.biorxiv.org/content/10.1101/2024.05.02.592265v1), a resolution comparable to X-ray crystallography. It has recently been recommended as a fast and cost-effective epitope mapping approach, using the complex protein system influenza hemagglutinin as an example.
- Cross-linking-coupled mass spectrometry. Antibody and antigen are bound to a labeled cross-linker, and complex formation is confirmed by high-mass MALDI detection. The binding location of the antibody to the antigen can then be identified by mass spectrometry (MS). The cross-linked complex is highly stable and can be exposed to various enzymatic and digestion conditions, allowing many different peptide options for detection. MS or MS/MS techniques are used to detect the amino-acid locations of the labelled cross-linkers and the bound peptides (both epitope and paratope are determined in one experiment). The key advantage of this technique is the high sensitivity of MS detection, which means that very little material (hundreds of micrograms or less) is needed.

Other methods, such as yeast display, phage display, and limited proteolysis, provide high-throughput monitoring of antibody binding but lack resolution, especially for conformational epitopes.

== See also ==
- Epitope binning
