= Pepscan =

Pepscan is a procedure for mapping and characterizing epitopes involving the synthesis of overlapping peptides and analysis of the peptides in enzyme-linked immunosorbent assays (ELISAs). The method is based on combinatorial chemistry and was pioneered by Mario Geysen and coworkers.

Rob Meloen was one of Geysen's co-workers. He also played an important role in the development of numerous other new technologies, including vaccine and diagnostic product development for several viral diseases. From 1994 to 2010, Meloen was Professor of Special Appointment (Chair: Biomolecular Recognition) at Utrecht University. He was one of the co-founders of the company Pepscan (Lelystad, the Netherlands) and became Scientific Director (CSO). Pepscan is now part of the Biosynth Group.

Twenty-five years later, the Pepscan methodology, evolved and modernized with the latest insights, is still an important part of Pepscan’s epitope mapping platform, which is instrumental in therapeutic antibody development.
