= Epitope binning =

Healthcare test

Epitope binning is a competitive immunoassay used to characterize and then sort a library of monoclonal antibodies against a target protein. Antibodies against a similar target are tested against all other antibodies in the library in a pairwise fashion to see if antibodies block one another's binding to the epitope of an antigen. After each antibody has a profile created against all of the other antibodies in the library, a competitive blocking profile is created for each antibody relative to the others in the library. Closely related binning profiles indicate that the antibodies have the same or a closely related epitope and are "binned" together. Epitope binning is referenced in the literature under different names such as epitope mapping and epitope characterization. Regardless of the naming, epitope binning is prevalent in the pharmaceutical industry. Epitope Binning is used in the discovery and development of new therapeutics, vaccines, and diagnostics.

== See also ==
- Autoimmunity
- Epitope mapping
