= Linear epitope =

Segment of a molecule which antibodies recognize by its linear structure

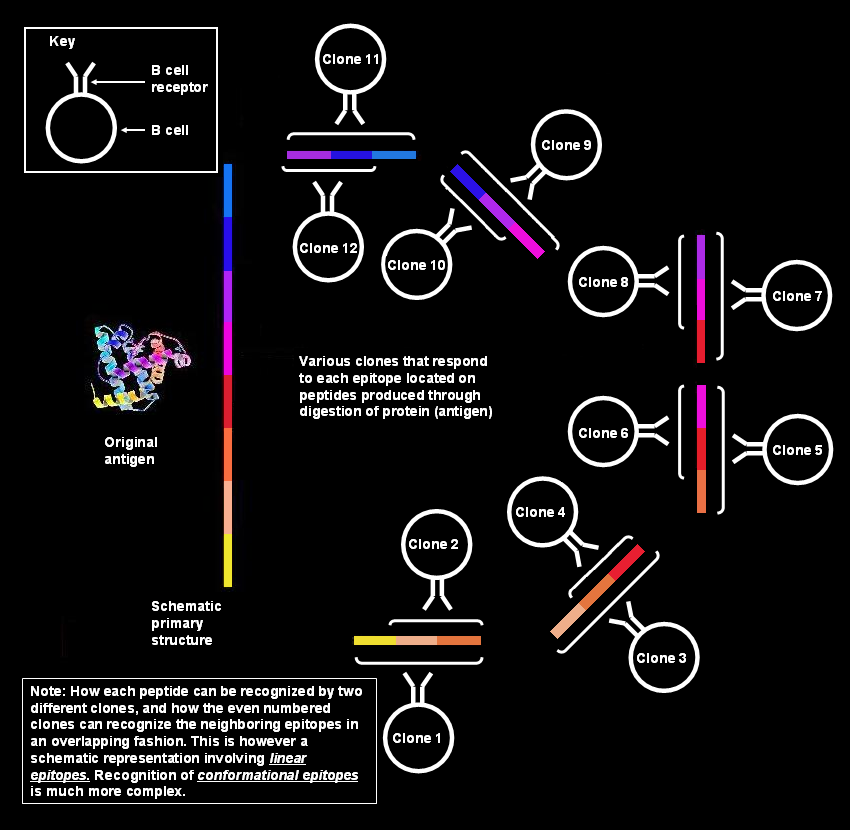
Recognition of epitopes in a linear fashion. Note: the same (colored) segment of protein can be a part of more than one epitopes

In immunology, a linear epitope (also sequential epitope) is an epitope—a binding site on an antigen—that is recognized by antibodies by its linear sequence of amino acids (i.e. primary structure). In contrast, most antibodies recognize a conformational epitope that has a specific three-dimensional shape (tertiary structure).

An antigen is any substance that the immune system can recognize as being foreign and which provokes an immune response. Since antigens are usually proteins that are too large to bind as a whole to any receptor, only specific segments that form the antigen bind with a specific antibody. Such segments are called epitopes. Likewise, it is only the paratope of the antibody that comes in contact with the epitope.

Proteins are composed of repeating nitrogen-containing subunits called amino acids. The linear sequence of amino acids that compose a protein is called its primary structure, which typically does not present as simple line of sequential proteins (much like a knot, rather than a straight string). But, when an antigen is broken down in a lysosome, it yields small peptides, which can be recognized through the amino acids that lie continuously in a line, and hence are called linear epitopes.

== Significance ==
While performing molecular assays involving use of antibodies such as in the Western blot, immunohistochemistry, and ELISA, one should carefully choose antibodies that recognize linear or conformational epitopes.

For instance, if a protein sample is boiled, treated with beta-mercaptoethanol, and run in SDS-PAGE for the Western blot, the proteins are essentially denatured and therefore cannot assume their natural three-dimensional conformations. Therefore, antibodies that recognize linear epitopes instead of conformational epitopes are chosen for immunodetection. In contrast, in immunohistochemistry where protein structure is preserved, antibodies that recognize conformational epitopes are preferred.

== See also ==
- Conformational epitope
- Polyclonal B cell response
