= Immune receptor =

Cell surface molecules of the immune system triggering changes in the behavior of cells

Schematic representation of an immune receptor

An immune receptor (or immunologic receptor) is a receptor, usually on a cell membrane, which binds to a ligand (usually another protein, such as cytokine) and causes a response in the immune system.

== Types ==
The main receptors in the immune system are pattern recognition receptors (PRRs), Toll-like receptors (TLRs), killer activated and killer inhibitor receptors (KARs and KIRs), complement receptors, Fc receptors, B cell receptors and T cell receptors.

Comparison of different receptor targets and associated functions
Receptor	Bind to	Function
Pattern recognition receptors (PRRs) (e.g. TLRs, NLRs)	Pathogen-associated molecular patterns (PAMP)	Mediate cytokine production → inflammation → destroying pathogen
Killer activated and killer inhibitor receptors (KARs and KIRs)		Avails NK cells to identify abnormal host cells (KAR) or inhibit inappropriate host cell destruction (KIR)
Complement receptors	Complement proteins on e.g. microbes	Allow phagocytic and B cells to recognize microbes and immune complexes
Fc receptors	Epitope-antibody complexes	Stimulate phagocytosis
B cell receptors	Epitopes	B cell differentiation into plasma cells and proliferation
T cell receptors	Linear epitopes bound to MHC	Activate T cells
Cytokine receptors	Cytokines	Regulation and co-ordination of immune responses

== See also ==
- Antigen
