= Paratope =

Part of an antibody which binds to an antigen

An antibody with a circled region depicting where the paratope is found.: 1. Antigen-binding fragment (Fab); 2. Antibody crystallizable region (Fc); 3. Heavy chains; 4. Light chains; 5. Variable region of the antibody. The paratope is the key-shaped section that makes direct contact with the antigen.; 6. Hinge regions

In immunology, a paratope, also known as an antigen-binding site, is the part of an antibody which recognizes and binds to an antigen. It is a small region at the tip of the antibody's antigen-binding fragment and contains portions of the antibody's heavy chain and light chain. Each paratope is a set of six complementarity-determining regions - three on the light chain and three on the heavy chain - that extend from a fold of anti-parallel beta sheets. Each arm of the Y-shaped antibody has an identical paratope at the end.

B-cell receptors include antibodies, so they include paratopes. All of the paratopes on any individual B cell are identical. The uniqueness of a paratope allows it to bind to only one epitope with high affinity and, as a result, each B cell can only respond to one epitope. The binding of paratopes on B-cell receptors to their specific epitope is a critical step in the adaptive immune response.

== Variability ==
The structure and properties of paratopes differ greatly among species. In jawed vertebrates, V(D)J recombination enables one individual to produce billions of different paratopes. However, the number of possible paratopes is limited by the composition of the V, D, and J genes and the structure of the antibody. In many species, additional mechanisms increase the diversity of possible paratopes. In cows, an extra-long complementarity-determining region is considered to have an essential role in diversifying paratopes. Chickens and rabbits use gene conversion to increase the number of possible paratopes.
