= Amphiregulin =

Protein-coding gene in the species Homo sapiens

AREG

Identifiers
- Aliases: AREG, AR, AREGB, CRDGF, SDGF, amphiregulin
- External IDs: OMIM: 104640; MGI: 88068; GeneCards: AREG
Available structures
PDB	Ortholog search: PDBe RCSB
PDB	List of PDB id codes 2RNL

Gene location (Human)
Chr.	Chromosome 4 (human)
Band	4q13.3	Start	74,445,136 bp
Band	4q13.3	End	74,455,005 bp

Gene location (Mouse)
Chr.	Chromosome 5 (mouse)
Band	5 E2|5 44.78 cM	Start	91,287,458 bp
Band	5 E2|5 44.78 cM	End	91,296,291 bp
RNA expression pattern
Bgee	Human / Mouse (ortholog); Top expressed in: mucosa of urinary bladder; right lung; glutes; gallbladder; mucosa of paranasal sinus; amniotic fluid; placenta; upper lobe of left lung; rectum; left uterine tube / Top expressed in: mucous cell of stomach; pyloric antrum; duodenum; lactiferous gland; large intestine; colon; left colon; embryo; embryo; lip; More reference expression data
BioGPS	n/a
Gene ontology
Molecular function	cytokine activity; epidermal growth factor receptor binding; protein binding; growth factor activity
Cellular component	cytoplasm; integral component of membrane; endoplasmic reticulum membrane; membrane; intracellular anatomical structure; cell surface; ER to Golgi transport vesicle membrane; endoplasmic reticulum-Golgi intermediate compartment membrane; nucleus; Golgi membrane; extracellular space; extracellular region; clathrin-coated vesicle membrane
Biological process	dichotomous subdivision of terminal units involved in mammary gland duct morphogenesis; G protein-coupled receptor signaling pathway; response to estradiol; epidermal growth factor receptor signaling pathway; response to organic cyclic compound; cell-cell signaling; mammary gland branching involved in thelarche; response to peptide hormone; response to glucocorticoid; mammary gland alveolus development; negative regulation of osteoblast differentiation; endoplasmic reticulum to Golgi vesicle-mediated transport; epithelial cell proliferation involved in mammary gland duct elongation; COPII vesicle coating; glial cell proliferation; response to cAMP; positive regulation of phosphorylation; cell population proliferation; neuron projection development; response to hydrogen peroxide; positive regulation of peptidyl-tyrosine phosphorylation; regulation of signaling receptor activity; positive regulation of cell population proliferation; MAPK cascade; signal transduction; negative regulation of epidermal growth factor receptor signaling pathway; positive regulation of protein kinase B signaling; membrane organization; positive regulation of keratinocyte proliferation
Sources:Amigo / QuickGO
Orthologs
Databases	NCBI: entry; OMA: entry
Species	Human	Mouse
Entrez	374	11839
Ensembl	ENSG00000109321	ENSMUSG00000029378
UniProt	P15514	P31955
RefSeq (mRNA)	NM_001657	NM_009704
RefSeq (protein)	NP_001648	NP_033834
Location (UCSC)	Chr 4: 74.45 – 74.46 Mb	Chr 5: 91.29 – 91.3 Mb
PubMed search
- Wikidata
View/Edit Human	View/Edit Mouse

Amphiregulin, also known as AREG, is a protein synthesized as a transmembrane glycoprotein with 252 aminoacids and it is encoded by the AREG gene. in humans.

== Function ==
The protein encoded by this gene is a member of the epidermal growth factor (EGF) family.

It is a critical autocrine growth factor as well as a mitogen for astrocytes, Schwann cells, and fibroblasts. It is a ligand for epidermal growth factor (EGF) and it is related to transforming growth factor alpha (TGF-alpha). This protein interacts with the Epidermal growth factor receptor (EGFR) to promote the growth of normal epithelial cells.

== Biological role ==
AREG is a critical factor in estrogen action and ductal development of the mammary glands. Amphiregulin has been found to be essential for mammary ductal development, as evidenced by absence of ductal growth in amphiregulin knockout mice. This is similar to the phenotypes of EGFR and ERα knockout mice, which also show absence of ductal growth. Amphiregulin is expressed in many parts of body such as ovaries, placenta, pancreas, breasts, lungs and spleen. Expression of amphiregulin can be induced by TGF-α, TNF-α, interleukin 1, and prostaglandins.

== Clinical significance ==
=== Role in tissue repair ===
Generally, amphiregulin is considered to be a part of type 2 mediated resistance and tolerance, the latter of which occurs by promoting the reestablishment of tissue integrity after damage that is due to acute or chronic inflammation. Its involvement in tissue repair can be explained by its dual role, as amphiregulin can induce mitogenic signals, but it can also lead to cell differentiation of epithelial cells.

While epithelial-derived amphiregulin can promote tissue repair, several immune cells are found to express it in cases of tissue damage, so amphiregulin is part of the crosstalk between immune and epithelial cells.

A population of immune cells that is found to increase its amphiregulin expression after tissue damage, is the innate lymphoid cell 2 (ILC2) population. This has been observed in several organs, such as the lung, the intestine, and the skin. The expression of amphiregulin by ILC2s can be induced by interleukin 33 (IL-33). Also, in skin derived ILC2s, amphiregulin expression was regulated by the interaction of killer-cell lectin-like receptor G1 (KLRG1) with E-cadherin. After intestinal damage, activated intestinal ILC2s produce amphiregulin which enhances the production of mucin by epithelial cells, increases the expression of Claudin-1 and promotes the activity of goblet cells. These functions of amphiregulin lead to increased junction strength, as well as the strengthening of the mucus layer.

Tissue resident regulatory T cells (Tregs) can also express amphiregulin to promote tissue repair. In the skeletal muscle, the IL-33 receptor (ST2) expressing Tregs have a distinct T-cell receptor (TCR) repertoire, and TCR signals don't seem to be required for amphiregulin production, but this process can be dependent on the IL-33/ST2 (or IL-33 receptor) pathway and the expression of interleukin 18 receptor (IL-18R) on tissue resident Tregs. Also, amphiregulin that is expressed from these Tregs can further enhance their function, forming an autocrine positive feedback loop. Amphiregulin-expressing tissue resident Tregs have been observed in the lung, where most of them are CD44^{hi}CD62L^{lo} and they express higher levels of CD103, programmed cell death protein 1 (PD-1), glucocorticoid-induced TNFR-related protein (GITR), cytotoxic T-lymphocyte antigen 4 (CTLA-4) and KLRG1. They have been found in injured muscles, where this population has been associated with eosinophil influx, and the production of amphiregulin could enhance the colony-forming efficiency and myogenic differentiation of skeletal muscle satellite cells in vitro, increasing muscle healing. In the inflamed colon, Gata3^{+}Helios^{+} Tregs express high levels of amphiregulin too. Moreover, Tregs that express amphiregulin, along with keratinocyte growth factor (KGF), CD39 and CD73, act on parenchymal cells to promote tissue repair and regeneration.

Some unconventional T cells have been associated with the promotion of tissue repair by amphiregulin in a direct or in an indirect manner. After intestinal damage, mucosal-associated invariant T (MAIT) cells produce amphiregulin that leads to epithelial cell turnover and enhances the activity of goblet cells. Also, a pro-repair response by amphiregulin produced by ILC2s and Tregs, that is dependent on IL-33 signaling, is induced by gamma delta (γδ) T cells that produce interleukin 17A (IL-17A). This correlation between IL-17A-producing γδ T cells and amphiregulin has been observed in the lungs and in the oral mucosa.

=== Psoriasis ===
Mutations in this encoded protein are associated with a psoriasis-like skin phenotype. Higher circulating levels of amphiregulin are associated with AGVHD progression.

=== Cancer ===
Overexpression of amphiregulin is connected with cancer of the breast, prostate, colon, pancreas, lung, spleen, and bladder.

=== Rheumatoid arthritis ===
It seems that expression of AREG is connected with proliferation of fibroblasts and production of proinflammatory cytokines interleukin 8 and vascular endothelial growth factor (VEGF).

=== Fibrosis ===
Chronic elevation of amphiregulin levels has been associated with fibrosis in several organs. ILC2s are drivers of liver, skin, and pulmonary fibrosis, and their expression of interleukin 13 (IL-13) and amphiregulin is implicated in this process. Pathogenic memory Th2 cells that express amphiregulin are also involved in pulmonary fibrosis. Exposure to house dust mite leads to the increase of amphiregulin-expressing pathogenic memory Th2 cells. This increase might be related to the IL-33/ST2 signaling, as blocking this pathway causes less production of amphiregulin. The function of amphiregulin in airway fibrosis is related to eosinophils that express EGFR, in which amphiregulin binds to, resulting in the upregulation of inflammatory genes, including Spp1 that encodes osteopontin. The expression of osteopontin by eosinophils shapes the pathogenesis of pulmonary fibrosis. Moreover, macrophage-derived amphiregulin is involved in the transforming growth factor beta (TGF-β)-induced fibrosis too, as it has been found to activate latent TGF-β through the activation of integrin-α_{V} complex. In the liver, ongoing necrosis leads to the activation of hepatic ILC2s which release amphiregulin along with IL-13. The release of them activates the hepatic stellate cells that transform into myofibroblasts, and ultimately promotes liver fibrosis.

== Inflammation ==
Amphiregulin is part of cellular response type 2. It was found that the cell source of amphiregulin is innate lymphoid cells 2 (ILC2) which are dependent on interleukin 33. ILC2 expressed amphiregulin after tissue damage of the intestines and activation by IL-33. Moreover, endogenous AREG with IL-33 decreased the intestinal inflammation in mice with normal count of T-lymphocytes and in deficient mice.
