= T-cell vaccine =

A T-cell vaccine is a vaccine designed to induce protective T-cells. It is not a vaccine whereby T-cells are administered to the patient.

T-cell vaccines are designed to induce cellular immunity. They are also referred to as cell-mediated immune (CMI) vaccines.

It is believed that CMI vaccines can be more effective than conventional B-cell vaccines for yielding protection against microbes which tend to hide within the host cell, and rapidly mutating microbes (such as HIV or the influenza virus).

T-cell vaccines underwent clinical trials for HIV/AIDS in about 2009.

As of July 2012 none had been approved.

However as at December 2020, the Pfizer-BioNTech SARS-CoV-2 vaccine was authorised pursuant to the US FDA's emergency use authorization and became the first FDA authorized T cell vaccine.
