= Type 3 innate lymphoid cells =

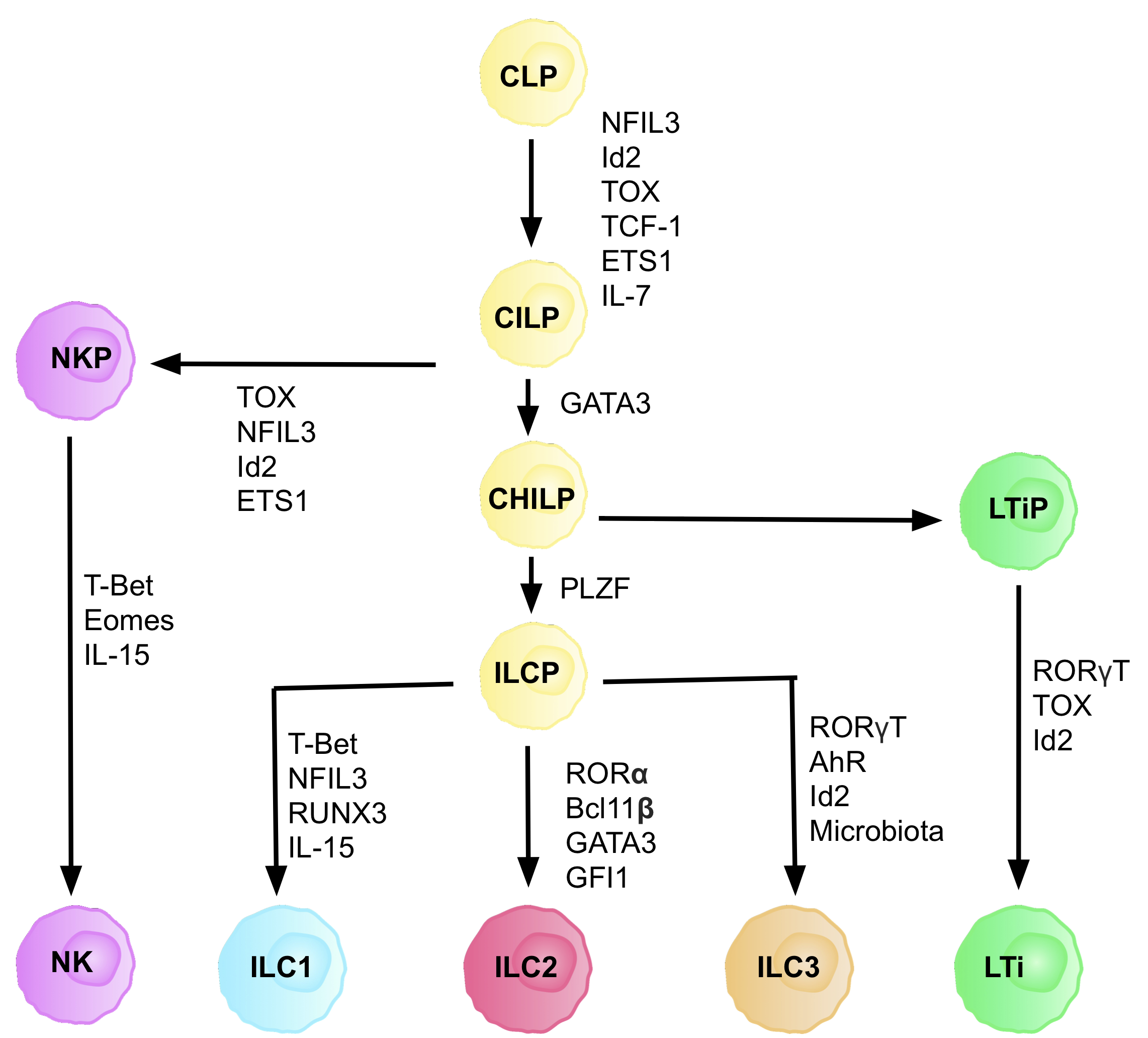
Schematic diagram of the development of ILCs, starting from the common lymphoid progenitor (CLP), mainly based on mouse differentiation pathways. ILC3s are shown in orange.

Type 3 innate lymphoid cells (ILC3) are immune cells from the lymphoid lineage that are part of the innate immune system. These cells participate in innate mechanisms on mucous membranes, contributing to tissue homeostasis, host-commensal mutualism and pathogen clearance. They are part of a heterogeneous group of innate lymphoid cells, which is traditionally divided into three subsets based on their expression of master transcription factors as well as secreted effector cytokines - ILC1, ILC2 and ILC3.

== Characterization ==
ILC 3 family can be divided into two subgroups based on their expression of natural cytotoxicity receptors (NCRs), designated NCR^{+} ILC3 and NCR^{−} ILC3. These receptors are commonly found on natural killer cells and some subpopulations of innate and adaptive cells. They are involved in activation and cytotoxic activity of NK cells, including cells lysis and secretion of pro-inflammatory cytokines. LTi cells (lymphoid tissue-inducing cells) are a subpopulation important in development of secondary lymphoid organs in embryogenesis. ILC3 cells produce cytokines typical for the population of Th17 helper lymphocytes. The characteristic feature of ILC3 is the expression of the RORγt transcription factor, which is needed for its development and expression of the chemokine receptor CCR6. This group of ILC produces IL-17 (especially IL-17A) and IL-22. Both cytokines can be produced by ILC 3 simultaneously or separately, provided that when IL-22 is produced alone it is a matter of NCR^{+} ILC3. ILC3 express IL-23R and the production of IL-17 and IL-22 is stimulated by IL-23 and IL-1β. For ILC3, the expression of the transcription factor RORγt and partially also the Ahr (aryl hydrocarbon receptor) is typical since interactions of these two transcription factors cause the accumulation of ILC 3 and the production of IL-22 in the intestines. There is high heterogeneity in surface markers of ILC3 cells, with tissue-specific populations that can differ in function based on context. ILC3 cells have also phenotypic plasticity and have been observed to acquire ILC1-like phenotype under certain circumstances.

== Function ==
ILC 3 represent a heterogenous population crucial for defense against extracellular parasites and maintenance of intestinal homeostasis. They participate in effective antimicrobial defence through the production of IL-17 and IL-22. The role of IL-22 in humans and mice is somewhat different. In the murine model, IL-22 was found to play a role in improving the course of inflammatory bowel disease and epithelial restoration in the loss of the protective mucin barrier in the large intestine. However, in humans with inflammatory bowel disease, IL-22 has an effect on the pathology of the disease. IL-22 is an important cytokine for maintaining intestinal homeostasis. The action of IL-22 helps enhance the defense of the surface of the intestinal mucosa by weakening the mucin layer and its ability to produce antimicrobial agents, such as β-defensins, is a powerful mechanism that helps maintain intestinal homeostasis. An increase in IL-22 levels together with increased β-defensin expression has been reported in inflammatory skin diseases such as psoriasis. IL-22, as well as IL-17, could thus be involved in the development of these skin diseases, since in humans without these problems IL-22 expression was not registered. The effects of IL-17 and IL-22 can complement each other and stimulate an increased amount of antimicrobial peptides at the site of action. Like ILC2, ILC 3 can express MHC II and be appropriating the function of antigen presenting cells. However, ILCs lack the costimulatory receptors that are necessary for proper activation and initiation of the immune response. ILCs, on the contrary, may set the helper T lymphocytes in the state of anergy. In the case of ILC 3, the ability to express MHC II apparently serves to maintain tolerance to commensal bacteria in the intestine. They suppress the response of CD4 + T lymphocytes to harmless and beneficial intestinal bacteria. If this tolerance is not maintained, there can be a development of undesirable pathological conditions. On the other hand, the action of IL-23 or IL-17 is not always beneficial. It causes some autoimmune diseases such as multiple sclerosis or rheumatoid arthritis. IL-17A specifically targets keratinocytes and is the major cytokine causing pathogenesis of skin psoriasis. In addition, IL-17A is also expressed to an increasing extent in patients with inflammatory bowel disease. ILC 3 may play a role already in the prenatal setting of the body's resistance to infections. LTi cells are important in the origin and development of secondary lymphoid organs. It has been found that differentiation and signalling of LTi cells are dependent on retinoic acid (a component of vitamin A). The uptake of retinoic acid in the diet by the mother directly affects the development of LTi cells and the size of the secondary lymphoid organs of the fetus, which may have an effect at its later age.

=== ILC3 cells in disease ===
ILC3 cells act as sentinels of the gastrointestinal tract. They are involved in maintaining homeostasis and tolerance to commensals, but are also important in defense against invading pathogens. Their transcriptional and cytokine profile is very similar to Th17 cells and ILC3s can also become pathogenic in certain circumstances, contributing to disease progression and inflammation. ILC3 have been linked to inflammatory bowel disease progression, which is an umbrella term describing chronic inflammatory conditions in the gastrointestinal tract, that have been linked to a plethora of factors including immune dysregulation and environmental cues, as well as genetic predisposition. Most well-known types of IBD are Crohn's disease and ulcerative colitis. Higher numbers of ILC3 cells have been detected in IBD patients' colonic isolates. NCR^{−} ILC3s have been shown to be pathogenic in the context of IBD, but not NCR^{+} ILC3s. Exact contribution of ILC3 subsets to the disease progression is not fully understood. Some studies show that Crohn's disease patients have decreased numbers of NCR^{+} ILC3s, which are key producers of IL-22. IL-22 is critical for intestinal epithelial barrier maintenance and integrity, and its decreased concentration could predispose to disruptions of epithelial barrier functions. Other studies however point to excessive ILC3 activation in both mouse models of IBD and human patients, where high levels of IL-22 were also detected. Intestinal macrophages have been shown to accelerate intestinal inflammation through inducing IL-22 production by mucosal ILC3. ILC3 have been observed to trans-differentiate into IFN-γ-producing ILC1-like cells via IL-23 and IL-12 signalling under certain circumstances, leading to chronic inflammation. In cases of extensive invasion of pathogens to intestinal epithelium, overexpression of IL-22 and IL-17 by ILC3 might lead to excessive neutrophil influx, higher epithelial permeability and inflammation.

ILC3 cells have in recent years also been linked to immune responses to fungal pathogen Candida albicans. This opportunistic pathogen induces Th17 immune response. This is supported by the fact that ILC3 cells mirror the phenotype of Th17 cells, and a subset of ILC3 cells has also been recently observed to have potent antigen presenting properties. ILC3s contribute in immune response to this pathogen by mediating the immune response via secretion of cytokines such as IL-17A.

They have also been shown to play a role in lung health and lung disease progression, since the IL-17/IL-22 axis is crucial for proper lung functioning, and its disbalance can lead to pathology. ILC2 group has been extensively studies in relation to lung health, since dysregulation in Th2 responses is linked to asthma and other pathologies This subset is also important for tissue repairs. ILC3s are, however, the most prevalent of the innate lymphoid cells populations in lung tissue. Balancing lung mucosal homeostasis and appropriate immune responses in infections is crucial. ILC3 cells are thought to play an important role in viral lung infections. In influenza infections, high levels of IL-17A have been detected shortly after infection, resulting in lung injury caused by extensive recruitments of neutrophils into the tissue. ILC3-derived IL-22 countered these effects, protecting the host tissues. IL-22 deficiency leads to extensive tissue damage. On the other hand, insufficient levels of IL-17A in influenza and bacterial co-infection resulted in secondary bacterial pneumonia. ILC3 cells likely play an important role in balancing out the immune response and protecting against secondary infections in disrupted mucosal epithelia, but in cases of dysregulation their activity can lead to tissue damage.

In bacterial lung infections ILC3s are one of the source populations for IL-17, a key cytokine for bacterial clearance. Monocytes recruited to lungs in response to tissue damage and PAMPs have been observed to produce TNF, increasing the numbers of IL-17 secreting ILC3s, subsequently leading to neutrophil influx. ILC3-derived IL-22 promotes epithelial proliferation and production of anti-microbial molecules.

ILC3 have also been implicated to play an important role in multiple sclerosis and the gut-brain axis. Multiple sclerosis is an autoimmune disorder driven by autoreactive T-cells, mainly Th1 and Th17 cells. Disruption in gut homeostasis is studied in relation to development of multiple sclerosis, as intestinal homeostasis appears to be essential for prevention of this disease. ILC3 cells have been implicated to have an important role in the pathogenesis of this disease, since they are a key population for gut homeostasis and tolerance. ILC3 cells express several surface receptors for diet-based compounds and microbial products alike, such as SCFA receptors. In multiple sclerosis patients or EAE mouse models, levels of SCFA in fecal matter are lowered, drawing a possible link between contents of gut lumen and ILC3 mediated homeostasis. Oral administration of SCFA has been shown to have beneficial effects in EAE in promoting Treg activity.
