= Cell-mediated immunity =

Immune response that does not involve antibodies

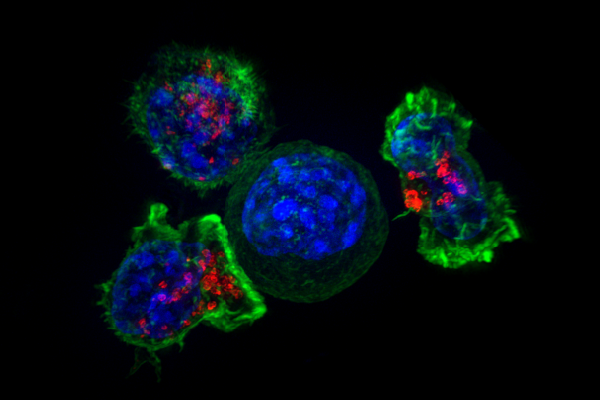
Immunofluorescence micrograph of three cytotoxic T cells (outer three) surrounding a cancer cell. Lytic granules (red) are secreted at the contact site, killing the target. Cytotoxic T cells are powerful agents of cellular immunity.

Cellular immunity, also known as cell-mediated immunity, is an immune response that does not rely on the production of antibodies. Rather, cell-mediated immunity is the activation of phagocytes, antigen-specific cytotoxic T cells (a.k.a. cytotoxic T lymphocytes), and the release of various cytokines in response to an antigen.

== History ==
In the late-19th-century Hippocratic tradition of medicine, the immune system was imagined having two branches: humoral immunity, for which the protective function of immunization could be found in the humor (cell-free bodily fluid or blood plasma) and cellular immunity, for which the protective function of immunization was associated with cells. CD4 cells or T helper cells (also known as helper T cells) provide protection against distinct pathogens. Naive T cells, which are immature T cells that have yet to encounter an antigen, are converted into activated effector T cells after encountering antigen-presenting cells (APCs). These APCs, such as macrophages, dendritic cells, and B cells, in some circumstances, load antigenic peptides onto the major histocompatibility complex (MHC) of the cell, in turn presenting the peptide to receptors on T cells. The most important of these APCs are highly specialized dendritic cells, which conceivably operate solely to ingest and present antigens. Activated effector T cells can be placed into three functioning classes, detecting peptide antigens originating from various types of pathogen:

- Cytotoxic T cells, which kill infected target cells by apoptosis without using cytokines;
- T_{h}1 cells, which primarily function to activate macrophages;
- T_{h}2 cells, which primarily function to stimulate B cells into producing antibodies.

In another schema, the innate immune system and the adaptive immune system each contain components of humoral immunity and cell-mediated immunity. Some cell-mediated components of the innate immune system, for example, include myeloid phagocytes, innate lymphoid cells (e.g., NK cells), and intraepithelial lymphocytes.

== Role of dendritic cells in cell-mediated immunity ==
Acting as a bridge between the innate and adaptive immune systems, dendritic cells (DCs) initiate interactions that drive T-cell activation. Myeloid phagocytic DCs capture antigens in peripheral tissues and migrate through lymphatic vessels into the lymph node, where they present antigens to T-cells. Said migration relies on the expression of C-C chemokine receptor type 7 (CCR7), which guides DCs along CCL19 and CCL21 gradients toward the lymph node. Once DCs are inside the lymph node, they release chemokines such as CCL5 and CCR7 that help recruit and position naïve T-cells and other leukocytes within the lymph node for antigen recognition. DCs then supply additional activation signals to T-cells by expressing co-stimulatory proteins such as CD80 and CD86 and by secreting cytokines like interleukin 12 (IL-12) and interleukin 2 (IL-2), which determine the strength of T-cell activation. DCs create the chemical and molecular environment required for complete T-cell activation and the development of cell-mediated immunity.

== Synopsis ==
Cellular immunity protects the body through:

- T-cell-mediated immunity (a.k.a. T-cell immunity): activating antigen-specific cytotoxic T cells that are able to induce apoptosis in body cells displaying epitopes of foreign antigen on their surface, such as virus-infected cells, cells with intracellular bacteria, and cancer cells displaying tumor antigens.
- Macrophage and natural killer cell (NK cell) action: enabling the destruction of pathogens via recognition and secretion of cytotoxic granules (for NK cells) and phagocytosis (for macrophages).
- Stimulating cells to secrete a variety of cytokines that influence the function of other cells involved in adaptive immune responses and innate immune responses.

Cell-mediated immunity primarily targets microbes that survive within phagocytes and those that infect non-phagocytic cells. It is most effective at removing virus-infected cells, but also participates in defending against fungi, protozoa, cancers, and intracellular bacteria. It also plays a major role in transplant rejection.

Type-1 immunity primarily targets viruses, bacteria, and protozoa and activates macrophages, turning them into potent effector cells. This is achieved by the secretion of interferon gamma and TNF.

== Overview ==
CD4^{+} T-helper cells (T_{h} cells) may be differentiated into two main categories:

1. T_{h}1 cells, which produce interferon gamma and lymphotoxin alpha.
2. T_{h}2 cells, which produce interleukin 4 (IL-4), interleukin 5 (IL-5), and interleukin 1 (IL-13).

A third category called T helper 17 cells (T_{h}17) were also discovered which are named after their secretion of interleukin 17 (IL-17).

CD8^{+} cytotoxic T-cells may also be categorized as:

1. T_{c}1 cells.
2. T_{c}2 cells.

Similarly to CD4^{+} T_{h} cells, a third category called T_{c}17 were discovered that also secrete IL-17.

The innate lymphoid cells (ILCs) may be classified into three main categories:

1. ILC1s, which secrete type I cytokines.
2. ILC2s, which secrete type II cytokines.
3. ILC3s, which secrete type 17 cytokines.

== Development of cells ==
All type 1 cells begin their development from the common lymphoid progenitor (CLp) which then differentiates to become the common innate lymphoid progenitor (CILp) and the t-cell progenitor (Tp) through the process of lymphopoiesis.

Common innate lymphoid progenitors may then be differentiated into a natural killer progenitor (NKp) or a common helper like innate lymphoid progenitor (CHILp). NKp cells may then be induced to differentiate into natural killer cells by IL-15. CHILp cells may be induced to differentiate into ILC1 cells by IL-15, into ILC2 cells by IL-7 or ILC3 cells by IL-7 as well.

T-cell progenitors may differentiate into naïve CD8^{+} cells or naïve CD4^{+} cells. Naïve CD8^{+} cells may then further differentiate into T_{C}1 cells upon IL-12 exposure, [IL-4] can induce the differentiation into T_{C}2 cells and IL-1 or IL-23 can induce the differentiation into T_{C}17 cells. Naïve CD4^{+} cells may differentiate into T_{H}1 cells upon IL-12 exposure, T_{H}2 upon IL-4 exposure or T_{H}17 upon IL-1 or IL-23 exposure.

== Type 1 immunity ==
Type 1 immunity makes use of the type 1 subset for each of these cell types. By secreting interferon gamma and TNF, T_{H}1, T_{C}1, and group 1 ILCS activate macrophages, converting them to potent effector cells. It provides defense against intracellular bacteria, protozoa, and viruses. It is also responsible for inflammation and autoimmunity with diseases such as rheumatoid arthritis, multiple sclerosis, and inflammatory bowel disease all being implicated in type 1 immunity. Type 1 immunity consists of these cells:

- CD4+ T_{H}1 cells
- CD8^{+} cytotoxic T cells (T_{c}1)
- T-Bet^{+} interferon gamma producing group 1 ILCs(ILC1 and Natural killer cells)

CD4^{+} T_{H}1 Cells

It has been found in both mice and humans that the signature cytokines for these cells are interferon gamma and lymphotoxin alpha. The main cytokine for differentiation into T_{H}1 cells is IL-12 which is produced by dendritic cells in response to the activation of pattern recognition receptors. T-bet is a distinctive transcription factor of T_{H}1 cells. T_{H}1 cells are also characterized by the expression of chemokine receptors which allow their movement to sites of inflammation. The main chemokine receptors on these cells are CXCR3A and CCR5. Epithelial cells and keratinocytes are able to recruit T_{H}1 cells to sites of infection by releasing the chemokines CXCL9, CXCL10 and CXCL11 in response to interferon gamma. Additionally, interferon gamma secreted by these cells seems to be important in downregulating tight junctions in the epithelial barrier.

CD8^{+} T_{C}1 Cells

These cells generally produce interferon gamma. Interferon gamma and IL-12 promote differentiation toward T_{C}1 cells. T-bet activation is required for both interferon gamma and cytolytic potential. CCR5 and CXCR3 are the main chemokine receptors for this cell.

Group 1 ILCs

Groups 1 ILCs are defined to include ILCs expressing the transcription factor T-bet and were originally thought to only include natural killer cells. Recently, there have been a large amount of NKp46^{+} cells that express certain master [transcription factor]s that allow them to be designated as a distinct lineage of natural killer cells termed ILC1s. ILC1s are characterized by the ability to produce interferon gamma, TNF, GM-CSF and IL-2 in response to cytokine stimulation but have low or no cytotoxic ability.

== See also ==
- Immune system
- Humoral immunity (vs. cell-mediated immunity)
- Immunity
