= Interleukin 33 =

Protein that in humans is encoded by the IL33 gene

IL33
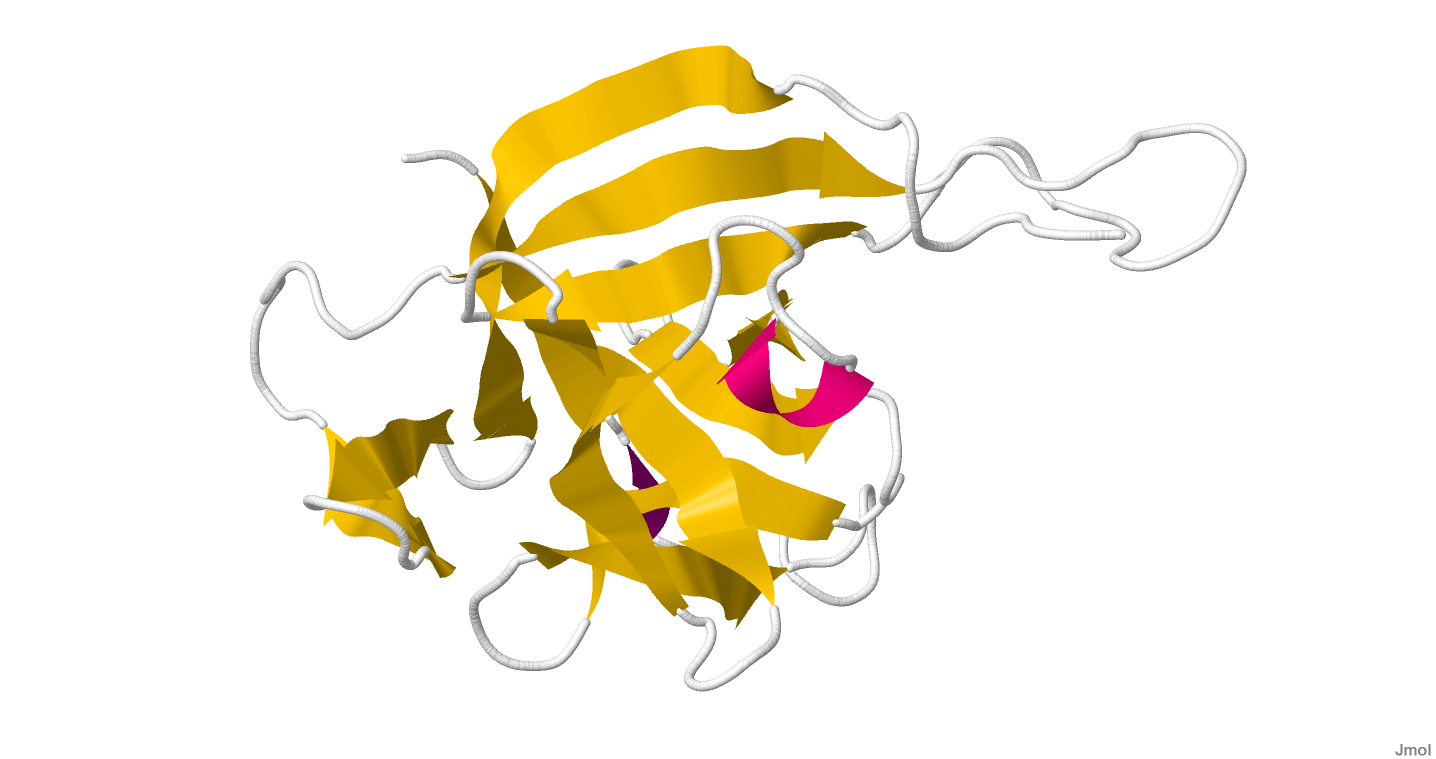

Identifiers
- Aliases: IL33, C9orf26, DVS27, IL1F11, NF-HEV, NFEHEV, Interleukin 33, IL-33, IL-1F11
- External IDs: OMIM: 608678; MGI: 1924375; GeneCards: IL33
Available structures
| PDB | Ortholog search: PDBe RCSB |
| PDB | List of PDB id codes 2KLL, 4KC3 |

Gene location (Human)
| Chr. | Chromosome 9 (human) |
| Band | 9p24.1 | Start | 6,215,786 bp |
| Band | 9p24.1 | End | 6,257,983 bp |

Gene location (Mouse)
| Chr. | Chromosome 19 (mouse) |
| Band | 19|19 C1 | Start | 29,902,514 bp |
| Band | 19|19 C1 | End | 29,938,118 bp |
RNA expression pattern
| Bgee | Human / Mouse (ortholog); Top expressed in: Achilles tendon; right coronary artery; olfactory zone of nasal mucosa; smooth muscle tissue; left coronary artery; Descending thoracic aorta; gallbladder; lymph node; ascending aorta; right auricle of heart / Top expressed in: ciliary body; olfactory epithelium; sciatic nerve; renal capsule; iris; mucous cell of stomach; substantia nigra; epithelium of stomach; endolymphatic duct; esophagus; More reference expression data |
| BioGPS | n/a |
Gene ontology
| Molecular function | cytokine activity; protein binding |
| Cellular component | transport vesicle; chromosome; cytoplasmic vesicle; nucleus; extracellular region; extracellular space; nucleoplasm |
| Biological process | negative regulation of interferon-gamma production; positive regulation of inflammatory response; positive regulation of interleukin-5 production; extrinsic apoptotic signaling pathway; positive regulation of macrophage activation; negative regulation of T-helper 1 type immune response; positive regulation of interleukin-4 production; transcription, DNA-templated; positive regulation of interleukin-13 production; positive regulation of gene expression; defense response to virus; positive regulation of interleukin-6 production; positive regulation of type 2 immune response; negative regulation of leukocyte migration; positive regulation of proteasomal ubiquitin-dependent protein catabolic process; positive regulation of transcription by RNA polymerase II; microglial cell proliferation; macrophage activation involved in immune response; microglial cell activation involved in immune response; type 2 immune response; protein deubiquitination; regulation of signaling receptor activity; interleukin-33-mediated signaling pathway; positive regulation of neuroinflammatory response |
Sources:Amigo / QuickGO
Orthologs
| Databases | NCBI: entry; OMA: entry |
| Species | Human | Mouse |
| Entrez | 90865 | 77125 |
| Ensembl | ENSG00000137033 | ENSMUSG00000024810 |
| UniProt | O95760 | Q8BVZ5 |
| RefSeq (mRNA) | NM_001199640; NM_001199641; NM_001314044; NM_001314045; NM_001314046 NM_001314047; NM_001314048; NM_033439; NM_001353802 | NM_001164724; NM_133775; NM_001360725 |
| RefSeq (protein) | NP_001186569; NP_001186570; NP_001300973; NP_001300974; NP_001300975 NP_001300976; NP_001300977; NP_254274; NP_001340731 | NP_001158196; NP_598536; NP_001347654 |
| Location (UCSC) | Chr 9: 6.22 – 6.26 Mb | Chr 19: 29.9 – 29.94 Mb |
| PubMed search |
- Wikidata
| View/Edit Human | View/Edit Mouse |

Interleukin 33 (IL-33) is a protein that in humans is encoded by the IL33 gene.

Interleukin 33 is a member of the IL-1 family that potently drives production of T helper-2 (Th2)-associated cytokines (e.g., IL-4). IL33 is a ligand for ST2 (IL1RL1), an IL-1 family receptor that is highly expressed on Th2 cells, mast cells and group 2 innate lymphocytes.

IL-33 is expressed by a wide variety of cell types, including fibroblasts, mast cells, dendritic cells, macrophages, osteoblasts, endothelial cells, and epithelial cells.

== Structure ==
IL-33 is a member of the IL-1 superfamily of cytokines, a determination based in part on the molecules β-trefoil structure, a conserved structure type described in other IL-1 cytokines, including IL-1α, IL-1β, IL-1Ra and IL-18. In this structure, the 12 β-strands of the β-trefoil are arranged in three pseudorepeats of four β-strand units, of which the first and last β-strands are antiparallel staves in a six-stranded β-barrel, while the second and third β-strands of each repeat form a β-hairpin sitting atop the β-barrel. IL-33 is a ligand that binds to a high-affinity receptor family member ST2. The complex of these two molecules with IL-1RAcP indicates a ternary complex formation. The binding area appears to be a mix of polar and non-polar regions that create a specific binding between ligand and receptor. The interface between the molecules has been shown to be extensive. Structural data on the IL-33 molecule was determined by solution NMR and small angle X-ray scattering.

== Function ==
Interleukin 33 (IL-33) is a cytokine belonging to the IL-1 superfamily. IL-33 induces helper T cells, mast cells, eosinophils and basophils to produce type 2 cytokines. This cytokine was previously named NF-HEV 'nuclear factor (NF) in high endothelial venules' (HEVs) since it was originally identified in these specialized cells. IL-33 acts intracellularly as a nuclear factor and extracellularly as a cytokine.

=== Role as alarmin ===
Alarmins, also known as danger-associated molecular patterns (DAMPs), are endogenous molecules that are released by stressed, damaged, or dying cells. They play a crucial role in the immune response by alerting the immune system to tissue damage or danger. The bioactive pro-inflammatory form of IL-33 is released from necrotic but not apoptotic cells, classifying it as alarmin. IL-33 released from damaged tissue during viral infection directly stimulates cytotoxic CD8+ T cells for the efficient generation of a memory–recall response and antiviral immunity.

=== Nuclear role ===
IL-33 is constitutively located in the nucleus of structural cells of humans and mice and has a helix-turn-helix domain presumably allowing it to bind to DNA. There is a paucity of research into the nuclear role of IL-33 but amino acids 40–58 in human IL-33 are sufficient for nuclear localisation and histone binding. IL-33 also interacts with the histone methyltransferase SUV39H1 and murine appears to IL-33 interact to NF-κB.

=== Cytokine role ===
As a cytokine, IL-33 interacts with the receptors ST2 (also known as IL1RL1) and IL-1 Receptor Accessory Protein (IL1RAP), activating intracellular molecules in the NF-κB and MAP kinase signaling pathways that drive production of type 2 cytokines (e.g. IL-5 and IL-13) from polarized Th_{2} cells. The induction of type 2 cytokines by IL-33 in vivo is believed to induce the severe pathological changes observed in mucosal organs following administration of IL-33. IL-33 is also effective in reversing Alzheimer-like symptoms in APP/PS1 mice, by reversing the buildup and preventing the new formation of amyloid plaques.

=== Regulation ===
Extracellularly, IL-33 is rapidly oxidised. The oxidation process results in the formation of two disulphide bridges and a change in the conformation of the molecule, which prevents it from binding to its receptor, ST2. This is believed to limit the range and duration of the action of IL-33.

== Clinical significance ==
IL-33 has been associated with several disease states through Genome Wide Association Studies: asthma, allergy, endometriosis, and hay fever. In particular, a single-nucleotide polymorphism rs928413 (A/G), is located in the 5′ upstream region of IL33 gene, and its minor "G" allele was identified as a susceptible variant for early childhood asthma and atopic asthma development. The rs928413(G) allele creates a binding site for the cAMP responsive element-binding protein 1 transcription factor that may explain the negative effect of the rs928413 minor "G" allele on asthma development. "T" allele of the polymorphism rs4742170 located in the second intron of IL33 gene was linked to specific wheezing phenotype (intermediate-onset wheeze). Risk "T" rs4742170 allele disrupts binding of GR transcription factor to IL33 putative enhancer that may explain the negative effect of the rs4742170 (T) risk allele on the development of wheezing phenotype that strongly correlates with allergic sensitization in childhood.

This protein is one of many that acts as a cytokine and signals inflammation in the body by acting upon macrophages, neutrophils, B cells, Th2 cells, eosinophils, basophils and mast cells. This protein is also thought to cause the itching that is associated with dermatitis. The IL-33 protein resides in keratinocytes of the skin and when subjected to irritation or allergic conditions will communicate with nearby sensory neurons and initiate an itchy feeling. In IL-33 knockout mice, it was discovered that nuclear IL-33 is associated with wound healing as mice without the protein healed significantly slower than mice with the IL-33 protein. Elevated levels of IL-33 are associated with asthma.

In mice, IL-33 was found to effect the production of methionine-enkephalin peptides in group 2 innate lymphocytes, in turn promoting the emergence of beige adipocytes, which leads to increased energy expenditure and decreased adiposity.

Elevated levels of IL-33 have been reported in some patients with nonsmall cell lung carcinomas. The source of elevated serum levels of IL-33 during the early stages could be bronchial and vascular epithelium. IL-33 knockdown showed lower growth of nonsmall cell lung carcinomas, while overexpression of IL-33 resulted in increased growth. Blocking of IL-33 reduced the growth of human nonsmall cell lung carcinomas. I mice model blocking of IL-33 inhibited tumor growth in immunodeficient mice.

In the mouse colon carcinoma model, IL-33 was expressed by tumor stromal cells, while the colon carcinoma cells did not express ST2 with or without IL-33 stimulation. The IL-33 knockout model had higher tumor growth than wild type. Similarly, IFN- γ expression was increased in the IL-33 knockout model as well as the number of T regulatory cells and CD8+ T cells.

Age-related macular degeneration is a retinal disease leading to neovascularization and thus impaired vision. Current treatment includes administration of anti-VEGF but is not sufficient. Retinal pigment epithelial cells can express IL-33 at both mRNA and protein levels. IL-33 expression is upregulated during inflammatory stimuli. IL-33 can inhibit fibroblasts and endothelial cells that express ST2, which can lead to reduced angiogenesis.

In a mouse model of chronic asthma, anti-IL-33 administration decreased antigen-induced immune response. Similar results were found in ST2 deficient mice. IL-33 activated innate lymphoid cells 2 remained in the lymph nodes for several weeks. CD4 + Th2 cells were formed after repeated exposure to IL-33. This type of cells highly produced IL-5.

Chronic inflammation is characteristic for IBD ( inflammatory bowel disease). Under normal conditions, IL-33 is present in healthy intestinal tissue, but during inflammatory conditions its expression is increased. However, IL-33 has also a protective role under inflammatory conditions and is involved in wound healing.

In brain, IL-33 is expressed in oligodendrocytes and astrocytes and is implicated in the pathophysiology of intracerebral hemorrhage.
