= TNFSF8 =

Protein

Identifiers
- Aliases: TNFSF8, CD153, CD30L, CD30LG, TNLG3A, tumor necrosis factor superfamily member 8, TNF superfamily member 8
- External IDs: OMIM: 603875; MGI: 88328; GeneCards: TNFSF8

Gene location (Human)
Chr.	Chromosome 9 (human)
Band	9q32-q33.1	Start	114,893,343 bp
Band	9q32-q33.1	End	114,930,595 bp

Gene location (Mouse)
Chr.	Chromosome 4 (mouse)
Band	4 C1|4 34.06 cM	Start	63,749,545 bp
Band	4 C1|4 34.06 cM	End	63,779,584 bp
RNA expression pattern
Bgee	Human / Mouse (ortholog); Top expressed in: monocyte; granulocyte; blood; lymph node; appendix; superficial temporal artery; spleen; gallbladder; bone marrow; amniotic fluid / Top expressed in: lymph node; intestinal villus; blood; thymus; jejunum; mesenteric lymph nodes; spleen; lumbar subsegment of spinal cord; carotid body; extraocular muscle; More reference expression data
BioGPS	n/a
Gene ontology
Molecular function	tumor necrosis factor receptor binding; cytokine activity; signaling receptor binding
Cellular component	integral component of membrane; integral component of plasma membrane; membrane; extracellular space; plasma membrane
Biological process	CD8-positive, alpha-beta T cell differentiation; cell-cell signaling; cell population proliferation; immune response; signal transduction; positive regulation of transcription by RNA polymerase II; defense response to Gram-positive bacterium; apoptotic process; tumor necrosis factor-mediated signaling pathway; regulation of signaling receptor activity; regulation of T cell proliferation
Sources:Amigo / QuickGO
Orthologs
Databases	NCBI: entry; OMA: entry
Species	Human	Mouse
Entrez	944	21949
Ensembl	ENSG00000106952	ENSMUSG00000028362
UniProt	P32971; Q52M88	P32972
RefSeq (mRNA)	NM_001252290; NM_001244	NM_009403
RefSeq (protein)	NP_001235; NP_001239219; NP_001235.1; NP_001239219.1	NP_033429
Location (UCSC)	Chr 9: 114.89 – 114.93 Mb	Chr 4: 63.75 – 63.78 Mb
PubMed search
- Wikidata
View/Edit Human	View/Edit Mouse

tumor necrosis factor (ligand) superfamily, member 8

Identifiers
- Symbol: TNFSF8
- Alt. symbols: CD30LG
- NCBI gene: 944
- HGNC: 11938
- OMIM: 603875
- RefSeq: NM_001244
- UniProt: P32971

Other data
- Locus: Chr. 9 q33
Search for
- Structures: Swiss-model
- Domains: InterPro

Tumor necrosis factor ligand superfamily member 8, also known as cluster of differentiation 153 (CD153), is a protein that in humans is encoded by the TNFSF8 gene.

CD153 is a cytokine ligand for the TNF receptor CD30. It plays a role in the T cell-dependent anti-mycobacterial immune response.
