= KLRG1 =

Protein-coding gene in humans

Identifiers
- Aliases: KLRG1, 2F1, CLEC15A, MAFA, MAFA-2F1, MAFA-L, MAFA-LIKE, killer cell lectin like receptor G1
- External IDs: OMIM: 604874; MGI: 1355294; GeneCards: KLRG1
Available structures
PDB	Ortholog search: PDBe RCSB
PDB	List of PDB id codes 3FF7

Gene location (Human)
Chr.	Chromosome 12 (human)
Band	12p13.31	Start	8,950,044 bp
Band	12p13.31	End	9,010,760 bp

Gene location (Mouse)
Chr.	Chromosome 6 (mouse)
Band	6 F1|6 57.52 cM	Start	122,247,555 bp
Band	6 F1|6 57.52 cM	End	122,259,841 bp
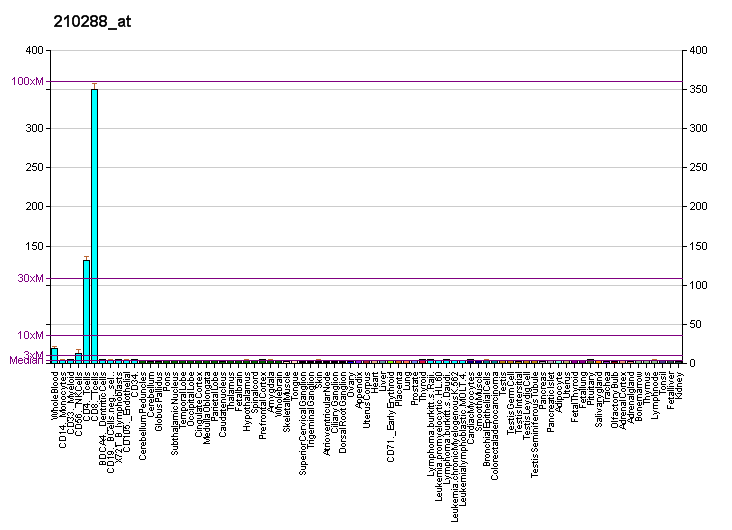
RNA expression pattern
Bgee	Human / Mouse (ortholog); Top expressed in: granulocyte; testicle; blood; gonad; epithelium of colon; lymph node; spleen; mucosa of ileum; tibialis anterior muscle; ganglionic eminence / Top expressed in: gastrula; blood; decidua; embryo; right ventricle; tibiofemoral joint; right lung; facial motor nucleus; lymph node; spleen; More reference expression data
BioGPS	More reference expression data
Gene ontology
Molecular function	protein binding; carbohydrate binding; signaling receptor activity
Cellular component	plasma membrane; membrane; integral component of membrane; intracellular membrane-bounded organelle
Biological process	innate immune response; inflammatory response; immune system process; cellular defense response; cell surface receptor signaling pathway
Sources:Amigo / QuickGO
Orthologs
Databases	NCBI: entry; OMA: entry
Species	Human	Mouse
Entrez	10219	50928
Ensembl	ENSG00000139187	ENSMUSG00000030114
UniProt	Q96E93	O88713
RefSeq (mRNA)	NM_001329099; NM_001329101; NM_001329102; NM_001329103; NM_005810	NM_016970
RefSeq (protein)	NP_001316028; NP_001316030; NP_001316031; NP_001316032; NP_005801	NP_058666
Location (UCSC)	Chr 12: 8.95 – 9.01 Mb	Chr 6: 122.25 – 122.26 Mb
PubMed search
- Wikidata
View/Edit Human	View/Edit Mouse

Killer cell lectin-like receptor subfamily G member 1 is a protein that in humans is encoded by the KLRG1 gene. It is also called MAFA (Mast cell function-associated antigen), especially in the rats.

MAFA (Mast cell function-associated antigen) is a type II membrane glycoprotein, first identified on the surface of rat mucosal-type mast cells of the RBL-2H3 line, unlike the human and mouse orthologs which are expressed by NK and T-cells. MAFA is closely linked with the type 1 Fcɛ receptors in not only mucosal mast cells of humans and mice but also in the serosal mast cells of these same organisms.

It has the ability to function as both a channel for calcium ions along with interact with other receptors to inhibit certain cell processes. It function is based on its specialized structure, which contains many specialized motifs and sequences that allow its functions to take place.

== Gene ==
=== Transcriptional and translational coding ===
As with other proteins, the MAFA undergoes both transcription followed by translation and post-translational modifications in the ER and Golgi. The genomic coding region of this protein consists of 13 kilobytes of genetic information with five exons that are split by four introns in the gene. Of these five exons, three are used to help code the CRD region that was previously mentioned. This gene is also regulated through an upstream promoter region that is 664 basepairs up from the first nucleotide of the protein. Like other proteins, the gene is copied in multiple starting points and put together into an mRNA transcript.

=== Alternative splicing ===
MAFA can also exist in multiple forms due to alternative splicing and one of these forms in a soluble version of the protein where its transmembrane portion was not translated and modified. This form of MAFA can diffuse out of the cellular membrane and into the extracellular matrix without being degraded or broken down by lysosomes, meaning that it does serve a function within human cells. The degree of glycosylation along with the specific function of these proteins is still yet to be discovered, but it is hypothesized that they play an important role in helping maintain calcium levels along with limiting the formation of inflammation mediators within these mast cells. Much about these alternative forms is yet to be discovered.

After the code was transcribed into mRNA, the MAFA strand was also found to undergo alternative splicing which has allowed various forms of the MAFA protein to be translated and lead to many of the variations previously discussed. One form of this code deletes the transmembrane portion of the MAFA protein and causes a soluble version to be made, being unique to this protein and has allowed scientists to apply this alternative splicing idea to other Mast cell transmembrane proteins as well. Once translated, the protein enters the proper cellular pathways from the ER to the Golgi and eventually the cellular membrane, where it is integrated and begins its functionality.

== Structure ==
MAFA is said to be a type II membrane glycoprotein, which means that its N-terminus will face the cytosol while its C-terminus will face the extracellular environment. The protein is 188 amino acids in length and has both hydrophobic and hydrophilic regions within these amino acids. The MAFA protein weighs between 28 and 40 kilodaltons and can exist as both a monomer or a homodimer in various species as seen by the SDS-PAGE results that show two broad bands based on these two forms. The MAFA core polypeptide sequence weights about 19 kilodaltons, however, a large amount of the weight comes from the N-linked oligosaccharides that are attached onto the protein. This heavy glycosylation is a common occurrence among type II membrane glycoproteins and is a key part of both their structure and function. The variation among glycosylation levels helps play an important role in the properties of MAFA proteins, so the protein must be properly made and modified in order to have full functionality.

=== CRD region ===
The C-terminus of MAFA contains 114 amino acids and has a distinct region called the carbohydrate recognition domain, or CRD for short. This region, as implied in the name, is where various carbohydrates and signaling molecules are recognized and attach to the protein. This CRD is present in many other glycoproteins present in higher level eukaryotes. The CRD is distinguished by a conserved 15 amino acid sequence that includes the following number of amino acids: two glycine residues, two leucine residues, five tryptophan residues, and six cysteine residues. These residues help to form various motifs through their interactions including both WIGL and CYYF motifs.

=== Intracellular domain ===
Along with specialized sequences on both the N terminus and C terminus, the intracellular domain of this protein contains a specialized sequence called the SIYSTL sequence, where the name is the one letter amino acid abbreviations of its residues. All of the amino acids in this sequence are polar in nature and are considered to be a part of the Immunoreceptor Tyrosine-based Inhibitory Motif (ITM). This ITIM allows the MAFA receptor protein to not only be considered a type II glycoprotein, but is also classified as an inhibitory receptor.

== Function ==
Natural killer (NK) cells are lymphocytes that can mediate lysis of certain tumor cells and virus-infected cells without previous activation. They can also regulate specific humoral and cell-mediated immunity. The protein encoded by this gene belongs to the killer cell lectin-like receptor (KLR) family, which is a group of transmembrane proteins preferentially expressed in NK cells. Studies in mice suggested that the expression of this gene may be regulated by MHC class I molecules.

KLRG1 is a lymphocyte co-inhibitory, or immune checkpoint, receptor expressed predominantly on late-differentiated effector and effector memory CD8+ T and NK cells. Its ligands are E-cadherin and N-cadherin with similar affinities, respective markers of epithelial and mesenchymal cells. Targeting of other co-inhibitory receptors for applications in oncology has gained widespread interest (e.g., CTLA-4, PD-1, and its ligand PD-L1). Unlike the obvious enhanced immune activation present in CTLA-4 and PD-1 gene knockout mice, KLRG1 knockout mice initially were found to have no abnormal features, though were subsequently found to have enhanced immunity in a tuberculosis challenge model.

The characterization of KLRG1 as a “senescent” marker, but other co-inhibitory receptors as “exhaustion” markers, has contributed to relatively fewer studies on this molecule.

=== Ion channel ===
As discovered by Ortega and Pecht, one of the main functions of MAFA is to function as a Ca^{2+} channel as seen in their experiment with inhibition of Ca^{2+} when the G63 antibody was bound to the MAFA receptor region. Additionally, as seen by the fact that it is a type II membrane glycoprotein and by its ability to change conformation to allow varying amount of calcium to enter the cell, MAFA also functions as a receptor molecule and can be inhibit various processes in the mast cells. Specifically, this inhibition is in part due to the SIYSTL motif at the C-terminus of the protein, which is in the extracellular matrix. This motif is dense with Tyrosine residues, some of which are phosphorylated. The phosphorylation on these residues play the primary role in allowing MAFA to inhibit different biochemical processes.

=== Clustering ===
==== Fcɛri ====
MAFA protein also interact greatly with FcɛRI receptors through the formation of aggregates and lipid rafts within the cellular membrane. By forming these aggregate structures, the conformation of MAFA is changed so that it can fully interact with the FcɛRI receptors and therefore cannot bind with the G63 monoclonal antibodies and is inhibited from allowing diffusion across its membrane. Along with inhibition of MAFA function, the FcɛRI receptor is also inhibited, meaning that even if a stimulus was bound to its receptor, the FcɛRI would not cause the hydrolysis of phosphatidylinositides as it normally does. Therefore, by forming these large clusters, both the function of MAFA and FcɛRI receptors are inhibited and can lead to further inhibitions of cell signaling processes within the cell. Even when the MAFA is not induced to interact heavily with FcɛRI, the mast cell membrane has natural interactions between these two receptors that cause small amounts of MAFA-FcɛRI complexes to be found without large changes to either of their functions. The specific mechanism by which the MAFA and FcɛRI interact and aggregate is still yet to be discovered.

=== Cell cycle ===
Along with interacting with other proteins, MAFA can form aggregates consisting only of itself, which are induced by either the monoclonal antibody G63, which was involved in its discovery, or by parts of the F(ab')2 antibody binding to its extracellular complex. By forming these MAFA groups, it was found to cause inhibition of cell cycle processes and prevent mitosis or DNA Replication from occurring. Specifically, this formation causes an increase in the tyrosine phosphorylation of various cyclins and proteins involved in the cell cycle. The main two proteins that are phosphorylated are p62^{DOK} and inositol phosphatase SHIP and this causes further change of downstream processes that these proteins are involved in. For p62^{DOK}, the phosphorylation process causes it to have increased binding to RasGAP, which functions to inhibit the Ras protein function by taking causing GTPase activity to take place and GDP to be bound, which inhibits Ras functionality. By having inhibition of Ras, further downstream promotion of DNA transcription is also halted, which includes some cell cycle proteins. For inositol phosphatase SHIP, the phosphorylation caused an increased amount of binding to Shc, which is normally found to be bound to Sos1 during cell cycling. Sos1 and SHIP both bind to Shc competitively and by having an increased affinity for Shc during phosphorylation, Sos1 binding decreases greatly. This relationship suggests that decreased Sos1 binding is also associated with halting the cell cycle, although the mechanism by which this inhibition occurs has not been discovered.

== Discovery ==
MAFA was initially discovered by Enrique Ortega and Israel Pecht in 1988 while studying the type 1 Fcɛ receptors (FcɛRI) and the unknown Ca^{2+} channels that allowed these receptors to work in the cellular membrane. Ortega and Pecht experimented through using a series of monoclonal antibodies on the RBL -2H3 line of rat mast cells. While experimenting and trying to find a specific antibody that would raise a response, the G63 monoclonal antibody was shown to raise a response by inhibiting the cellular secretions linked to the FcɛRI receptors in these rat mucosal mast cells. The G63 antibody attached to a specific membrane receptor protein that caused the inhibition process to occur. Specifically, the inhibition occurred by the G63 antibody and glycoprotein cross-linking so that the processes of inflammation mediator formation, Ca2+ intake into the cell, and the hydrolysis of phosphatidylinositides were all stopped. This caused biochemical inhibition of the normal FcɛRI response. The identified receptor protein was then isolated and studied where it was found that when cross-linked, the protein actually had a conformational change that localized the FcɛRI receptors. Based on these results, both Ortega and Pecht named this newly discovered protein Mast cell function-associated antigen or MAFA for short.
