= ILC2 =

Type 2 innate lymphoid cells, a type of immune cell

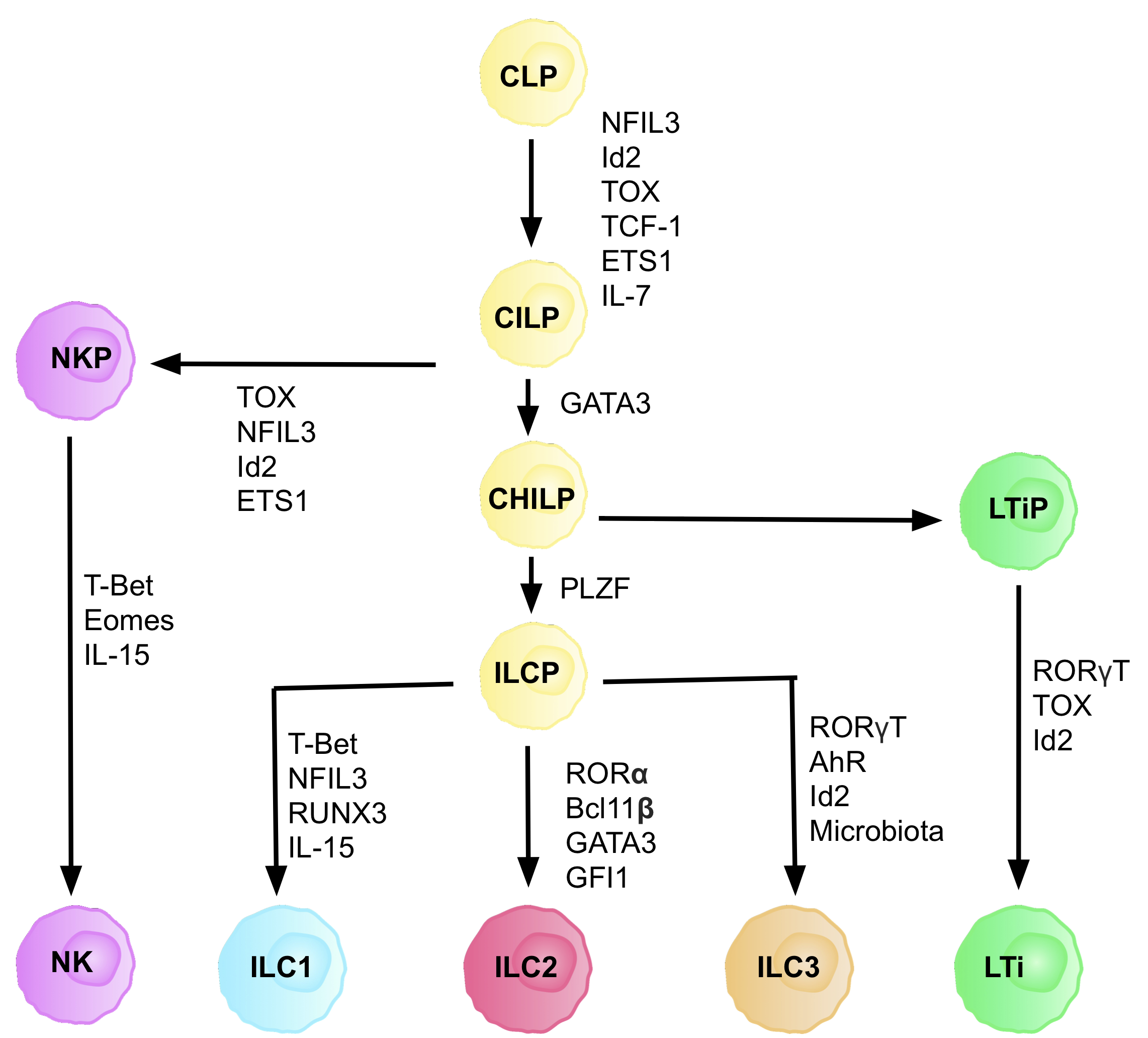
Schematic diagram of the development of ILCs, mainly based on mouse differentiation pathways.

ILC2 cells, or type 2 innate lymphoid cells are a type of innate lymphoid cell. They are derived from the common lymphoid progenitor (CLP) and belong to the lymphoid lineage. These cells lack antigen-specific B or T cell receptors because of the lack of recombination activating gene. ILC2s produce type 2 cytokines (e.g. IL-4, IL-5, IL-9, IL-13) and are involved in responses to helminths, allergens, some viruses, such as influenza virus and cancer.

The cell type was first described in 2001 as non-B/non-T cells, which produced IL-5 and IL-13 in response to IL-25 and expressed MHC class II and CD11c. In 2006, a similar cell population was identified in a case of helminthic infection. The name "ILC2" was not proposed until 2013. They were previously identified in literature as natural helper cells, nuocytes, or innate helper 2 cells. It is believed that ILC2s are a rather old cell type with ancestor populations emerging in lamprey and bony fish.

== Parasitic infection ==
ILC2s play the crucial role of secreting type 2 cytokines in response to large extracellular parasites. They express characteristic surface markers and receptors for chemokines, which are involved in distribution of lymphoid cells to specific organ sites. They require IL-7 for their development, which activates two transcription factors (both required by these cells)—RORα and GATA3. After stimulation with Th2 polarising cytokines, which are secreted mainly by epithelia (e.g. IL-25, IL-33, TSLP, prostaglandin D2 and leukotriene D4), ILC2s begin to produce IL-5, IL-13, IL-9, IL-4 rapidly. ILC2s are critical for primary responses to local Th2 antigens e.g. helminths and viruses and that is why ILC2s are abundant in the tissues of skin, lungs, liver and gut. It has been observed that ILC2s originate in the gut, enter lymphatic vessels and then circulate in the bloodstream so they can migrate to other organs to help fight the parasitic infection. The trafficking is partly sphingosine 1-phosphate-dependent. For example, during an Nippostrongylus brasiliensis infection, ILC2s contribute to worm clearance by producing the essential cytokine IL-13. IL-13 secreted by ILC2s also promotes migration of activated lung dendritic cells into the draining lymph node, which then results in naive T cell priming and differentiation into Th2 cells.

== Respiratory virus infection ==
It has been observed, that ILC2s are activated upon respiratory virus infections in mice and humans. For instance, during Influenza A virus infection, which induces IL-33 production, ILC2s are activated and drive airway hyper-responsiveness. Another example is an Respiratory syncytial virus infection, where ILC2s contribute by being the main source of IL-13 early in the infection leading to airway hyper-responsiveness and increased mucus production.

== Allergy, atopic dermatitis, and asthma ==
ILC2s play a variety of roles in allergy. Primarily, they provide a source of the type 2 cytokines that orchestrate the allergic immune response. They produce a profile of signals in response to pro-allergenic cytokines IL-25 and IL-33 that is similar to those produced in response to helminthic infection. Their contribution to this signaling appears to be comparable to that of T cells. In response to allergen exposure in the lungs, ILC2s produce IL-13, a necessary cytokine in the pathogenesis of allergic reactions. This response appears to be independent of T and B cells. Further, allergic responses that resemble asthma-like symptoms have been induced in mice that lack T and B cells using IL-33. It has also been found that ILC2s are present in higher concentrations in tissues where allergic symptoms are present, such as in the nasal polyps of patients with chronic rhinosinusitis and the skin from patients with atopic dermatitis.

== Barrier function ==
ILC2s are known to be enriched in the Fat-Associated Lymphoid Clusters (FALCs) within the mesenteries. IL-5 secreted by ILC2s is essential growth factor for B1 B cells and therefore important in the IgA antibody production. Besides the type 2 cytokines, ILC2s can also produce IL-6, which induces antibody production by B-cells, acts as a growth factor for plasmablasts and contributes in regulation of T follicular helper cells.

ILC2s are also known to be present in the FALCs within the pleural cavity. After being stimulated via IL-33 during an infection, they begin to secrete IL-5, leading to an activation of B1 B cells and the production of IgM antibodies. ILC2s are the dominant population of ILC in the lungs. By producing IL-13, they can initiate smooth muscle contraction and mucus secretion, but also goblet cell hyperplasia if the IL-13 is overexpressed. In addition, ILC2s help pulmonary wound healing after influenza infection by secreting amphiregulin. Besides lungs, ILC2 populations can also be found in human nasal and tonsil tissues.

== Adipose tissue homeostasis ==
ILC2s are essential in the maintenance of homeostasis in lean and healthy adipose tissue. ILC2s resident in visceral adipose tissue produce IL-5, IL-13 and methionine-enkephalin peptides after prolonged exposure to IL-33. IL-5 secreted by ILC2s in adipose tissue is crucial for the recruitment and maintenance of eosinophils. Furthermore, production of IL-13 and IL-4 by ILC2 and eosinophils supports the maintenance of alternatively activated M2 macrophages and glucose homeostasis.

Research identified dysregulated responses of ILC2s in adipose tissue as a factor in the development of obesity in mice since ILC2s also play important role in energy homeostasis. Methionine-enkephalin peptides produced by ILC2s act directly on adipocytes to upregulate UCP1 and promote emergence of beige adipocytes in white adipose tissue. Beige and brown adipose tissue are specialized in thermogenesis. The process of beiging leads to increased energy expenditure and decreased adiposity.
