= IL-4-inhibitor-1 =

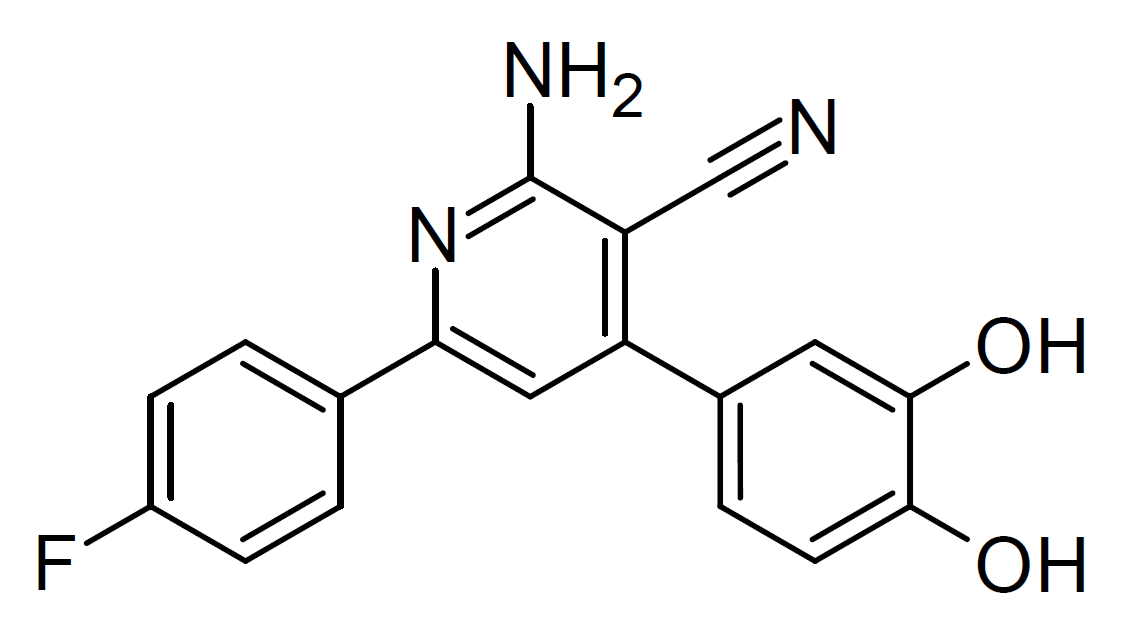

Identifiers
- IUPAC name: 2-amino-4-(3,4-dihydroxyphenyl)-6-(4-fluorophenyl)pyridine-3-carbonitrile
- CAS Number: 1332184-63-0
- PubChem CID: 136164931
- ChemSpider: 29569525
- ChEMBL: ChEMBL5266734

Chemical and physical data
- Formula: C_{18}H_{12}FN_{3}O_{2}
- Molar mass: 321.311 g·mol^{−1}
- 3D model (JSmol): Interactive image
- SMILES: C1=CC(=CC=C1C2=NC(=C(C(=C2)C3=CC(=C(C=C3)O)O)C#N)N)F
- InChI: InChI=1S/C18H12FN3O2/c19-12-4-1-10(2-5-12)15-8-13(14(9-20)18(21)22-15)11-3-6-16(23)17(24)7-11/h1-8,23-24H,(H2,21,22); Key:DWZPPBGRCDPFSS-UHFFFAOYSA-N

IL-4-inhibitor-1 is an experimental drug which was the first molecule discovered that interferes with the binding between interleukin-4 and the Interleukin-4 receptor, and so blocks its activity in the body. Interleukin-4 is a cytokine signalling molecule which has an important role in processes such as inflammation and wound repair, but excessive IL-4 activity is a feature of some forms of cancer as well as some inflammatory conditions such as asthma, so blocking IL-4 activity may have several potential medical applications. IL-4-inhibitor-1 binds with reasonable affinity but is unlikely to be potent enough for clinical use, however its development is likely to lead to the development of more potent related drugs. The interleukin-4 receptor is also the target for a different cytokine interleukin-13, but it remains unclear at this stage whether IL-4-inhibitor-1 is selective for inhibition of IL-4 while sparing IL-13 activity, or if it blocks the activity of both cytokines.

== See also ==
- Dupilumab
- LMT-28
