= Interleukin-13 receptor =

Cell surface receptors for interleukin-13

interleukin 13 receptor, alpha 1

Identifiers
- Symbol: IL13RA1
- Alt. symbols: IL-13Ra, NR4, CD213a1
- NCBI gene: 3597
- HGNC: 5974
- OMIM: 300119
- RefSeq: NM_001560
- UniProt: P78552

Other data
- Locus: Chr. X q24
Search for
- Structures: Swiss-model
- Domains: InterPro

interleukin 13 receptor, alpha 2

Identifiers
- Symbol: IL13RA2
- Alt. symbols: IL-13R, IL13BP, CD213a2
- NCBI gene: 3598
- HGNC: 5975
- OMIM: 300130
- RefSeq: NM_000640
- UniProt: Q14627

Other data
- Locus: Chr. X q13.1-q28
Search for
- Structures: Swiss-model
- Domains: InterPro

interleukin 4 receptor

Identifiers
- Symbol: IL4R
- Alt. symbols: IL4RA; CD124
- NCBI gene: 3566
- HGNC: 6015
- OMIM: 147781
- RefSeq: NM_000418
- UniProt: Q9H186

Other data
- Locus: Chr. 16 p12.1-11.2
Search for
- Structures: Swiss-model
- Domains: InterPro

The interleukin-13 receptor is a type I cytokine receptor, binding Interleukin-13. It consists of two subunits, encoded by IL13RA1 and IL4R, respectively. These two genes encode the proteins IL-13Rα1 and IL-4Rα. These form a dimer with IL-13 binding to the IL-13Rα1 chain and IL-4Rα stabilises this interaction. This IL-13 receptor can also instigate IL-4 signalling. In both cases this occurs via activation of the Janus kinase (JAK)/Signal Transducer and Activator of Transcription (STAT) pathway, resulting in phosphorylation of STAT6. Phosphorylated STAT6 dimerises and acts as a transcription factor activating many genes, such as eotaxin.

There is also another receptor that can bind IL-13: IL-13Rα2 encoded by the IL13RA2 gene. This binds IL-13 with very high affinity (and can therefore sequester it) but does not allow IL-4 binding. It acts as a negative regulator of both IL-13 and IL-4, however the mechanism of this is still undetermined.

== Function ==
Interleukin 13 (IL-13) is an effector cytokine partially sharing the signaling pathways with IL-4 due to the utilization of a common receptor system (IL-4 receptor type II). A “private” receptor system, binding specifically IL-13 with high affinity, seems to use different signalling pathways and is increasingly being studied for its potential as a novel prognostic factor, biomarker or therapeutic target in different types of cancer.

=== The “shared” IL-4 / IL-13 receptor ===
IL-13 uses the IL-4 receptor type II (IL-4RII), a complex formed by an IL-4Rα chain and an IL-13Rα1 chain. Initially, the ligand (IL-4 or IL-13) binds to the IL-4Rα chain and IL-13Rα1 respectively; thereafter, a secondary chain (IL-13Rα1 and IL-4Rα respectively) will also bind, forming the complete IL-4RII. The IL-4/IL-4Rα complex, however, can also bind to a different secondary chain, the IL-2Rγc, forming the IL-4 receptor type I (IL-4RI). In non-hematopoietic cells, IL-2Rγc is poorly expressed; on the other hand, IL-13Rα1 is poorly expressed in lymphocytes but abundantly in all non-hematopoietic cells; myeloid cells express both of them to a certain degree. This different distribution of secondary chains accounts for the difference in distribution of completed receptors, with being IL-4RI prevalently expressed in lymphocyte, and IL-4RII prevalently in non-hematopoietic cells. Consequently, only IL-4, through IL-4R1, is able to modulate the function of lymphocytes inducing Th2 polarisation and B cells IgG1/IgE class switching, while IL-13 is mainly acting on myeloid cells and non-hematopoietic cells, having strong effects on mucus production, smooth muscle contraction, epithelium permeabilisation (e.g. allergic asthma). After the complete assemblage, the conformational changes in IL-4RI or IL-4RII tails leads to the intracellular signaling, starting with the auto and cross-phosphorylation of associated Jak kinases (Jak3 for IL-2Rγc, Jak1 for IL-4Rα, Jak2 and Tyk2 for IL-13Rα1), and followed by phosphorylation of intracellular domains of IL-4Rα in critical Y residues which are therefore activated to form the docking sites for downstream signalling molecules endowed with SH domains. While the docking sites in IL-4R1 (and consequently IL-4) are able to efficiently activate both STAT6 and IRS2 signalling molecules, IL-4RII (and consequently IL-13) only activates effectively STAT6. Activated STAT6 molecules form dimers which translocate to the nucleus to bind responsive elements (e.g. CD23 promoter in B cells, arginase1 enhancer in macrophages ) The binding affinity of IL-4 for IL-4Rα is much higher than IL-13 for the IL-13Rα1, hence IL-4 would out-compete IL-13 for receptor availability within IL4R2 at parity of concentration.

=== The “private” IL-13 receptor ===
Besides IL-13Rα1 chain (which work in conjunction with the IL-4Rα, IL-13 can bind with much higher affinity to IL-13Rα2. IL-13Rα2 presents 35% homology with IL-13Rα1 and it is expressed mostly in structural cell (but also has been identified in fibroblasts and, only in mice, in soluble form). It presents an extraordinary affinity to IL-13, but does not form complexes with any secondary chain. Because of the apparent lack of signaling domain and the short tail, it has been initially thought not to have any signaling activity, and regarded as “decoy” receptor, that is its function would just consist in competing for IL-13 binding and neutralizing his effect. Indeed, it has been shown that IL-13Rα2 blocks IL-13 driven STAT6 signalling by binding IL-13 with high affinity, however a partial block is also extending to IL-4 driven STAT6 signalling, presumably due to the cytoplasmic domain interfering with the assembling of IL-4/IL-4Rα with a secondary chain. However, increasing evidences are accumulating that IL-13Rα2 is more than a “decoy”. IL-13 signalling through IL-13Rα2 and AP1-driven TGF-β production has been initially reported in monocytes and then confirmed in mouse models. According these studies, IL-13, through the over-expression (TNF-α induced) of IL-13Rα2 would be able to activate AP-1 signalling and production of TGF-β, driving pro-fibrotic effects. Some recent works is evidencing how a wide range of signals can be actually activated by this receptor (e.g. WNT/β-Catenin, MAPK/ERK, AKT/PKB, Src/FAK, PIP3K ) in normal or pathologic environments. How IL-13Rα2 might overcome the limitation of a 17 aminoacids short tail lacking any signalling motif, it is not clear yet but it has been shown that, at least in some cases, the association with other receptors or signalling adaptors can do the trick.
