= IL13RA2 =

Protein-coding gene in the species Homo sapiens

Identifiers
- Aliases: IL13RA2, CD213A2, CT19, IL-13R, IL13BP, interleukin 13 receptor subunit alpha 2
- External IDs: OMIM: 300130; MGI: 1277954; GeneCards: IL13RA2
Available structures
PDB	Ortholog search: PDBe RCSB
PDB	List of PDB id codes 3LB6

Gene location (Human)
Chr.	X chromosome (human)
Band	Xq23	Start	115,003,975 bp
Band	Xq23	End	115,019,977 bp

Gene location (Mouse)
Chr.	X chromosome (mouse)
Band	X F2|X 68.46 cM	Start	146,166,472 bp
Band	X F2|X 68.46 cM	End	146,212,188 bp
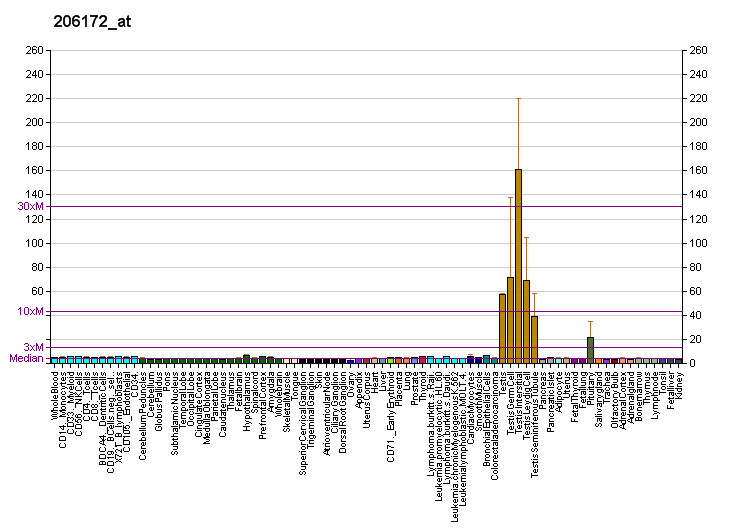
RNA expression pattern
Bgee	Human / Mouse (ortholog); Top expressed in: sperm; Descending thoracic aorta; ascending aorta; right testis; left testis; gonad; glomerulus; metanephric glomerulus; testicle; anterior pituitary / Top expressed in: cumulus cell; pineal gland; mesenteric lymph nodes; uterus; lip; gastrula; ascending aorta; aortic valve; dentate gyrus of hippocampal formation granule cell; skin of external ear; More reference expression data
BioGPS	More reference expression data
Gene ontology
Molecular function	cytokine receptor activity; signal transducer activity; protein binding; cytokine binding
Cellular component	integral component of membrane; membrane; extracellular region; extracellular space; external side of plasma membrane; receptor complex
Biological process	negative regulation of mast cell degranulation; negative regulation of immunoglobulin production; immunoglobulin mediated immune response; cytokine-mediated signaling pathway
Sources:Amigo / QuickGO
Orthologs
Databases	NCBI: entry; OMA: entry
Species	Human	Mouse
Entrez	3598	16165
Ensembl	ENSG00000123496	ENSMUSG00000031289
UniProt	Q14627	O88786
RefSeq (mRNA)	NM_000640	NM_008356; NM_001306059
RefSeq (protein)	NP_000631	NP_001292988; NP_032382
Location (UCSC)	Chr X: 115 – 115.02 Mb	Chr X: 146.17 – 146.21 Mb
PubMed search
- Wikidata
View/Edit Human	View/Edit Mouse

Interleukin-13 receptor subunit alpha-2 (IL-13Rα2), also known as CD213A2 (cluster of differentiation 213A2), is a membrane bound protein that in humans is encoded by the IL13RA2 gene.

== Function ==
IL-13Rα2 is closely related to IL-13Rα1, a subunit of the interleukin-13 receptor complex. This protein binds IL13 with high affinity, but lacks any significant cytoplasmic domain, and does not appear to function as a signal mediator. It is, however, able to regulate the effects of both IL-13 and IL-4, despite the fact it is unable to bind directly to the latter. It is also reported to play a role in the internalization of IL13.

IL-13Rα2 was initially considered a “decoy receptor” because its short intracellular domain and lack of a conventional JAK/STAT signaling motif suggested that it primarily functioned by binding and sequestering IL-13 without initiating downstream signaling. However, subsequent studies have demonstrated that IL-13Rα2 can activate distinct signaling pathways, including AP-1 and TGF-β production. These findings have established a more active role for IL-13Rα2 in cancer biology, where it has been implicated in tumor proliferation, invasion, and metastasis..

== Clinical significance ==
IL-13Rα2 has been found to be over-expressed in a variety of cancers, including pancreatic, ovarian, melanomas, and malignant gliomas.

== See also ==
- Interleukin-13 receptor
