= Prurigo nodularis =

- Other names: Hyde's disease, nodular prurigo
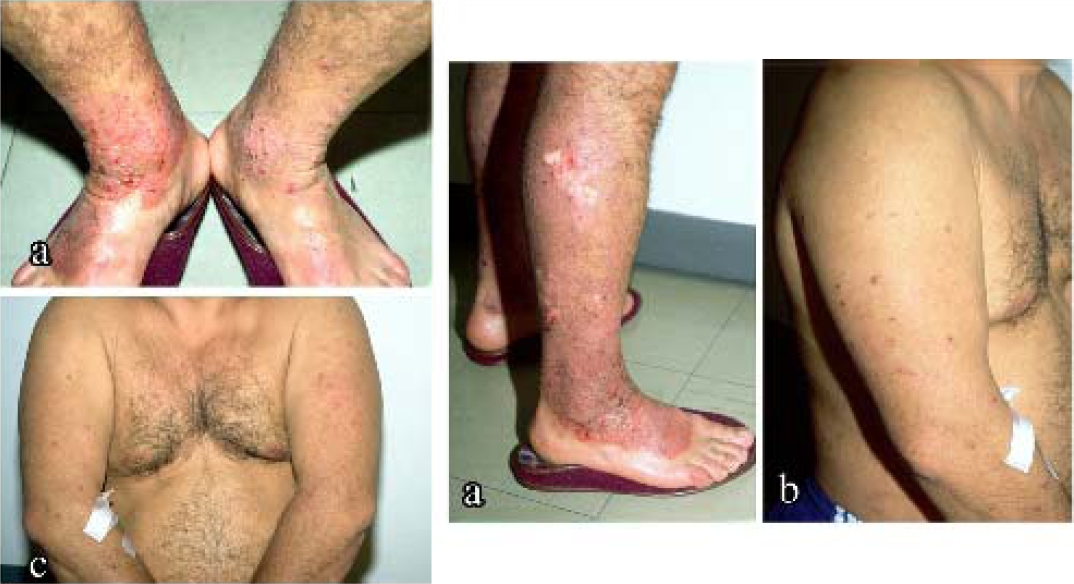
- Prurigo nodularis lesions on the legs, arms, and trunk of a patient
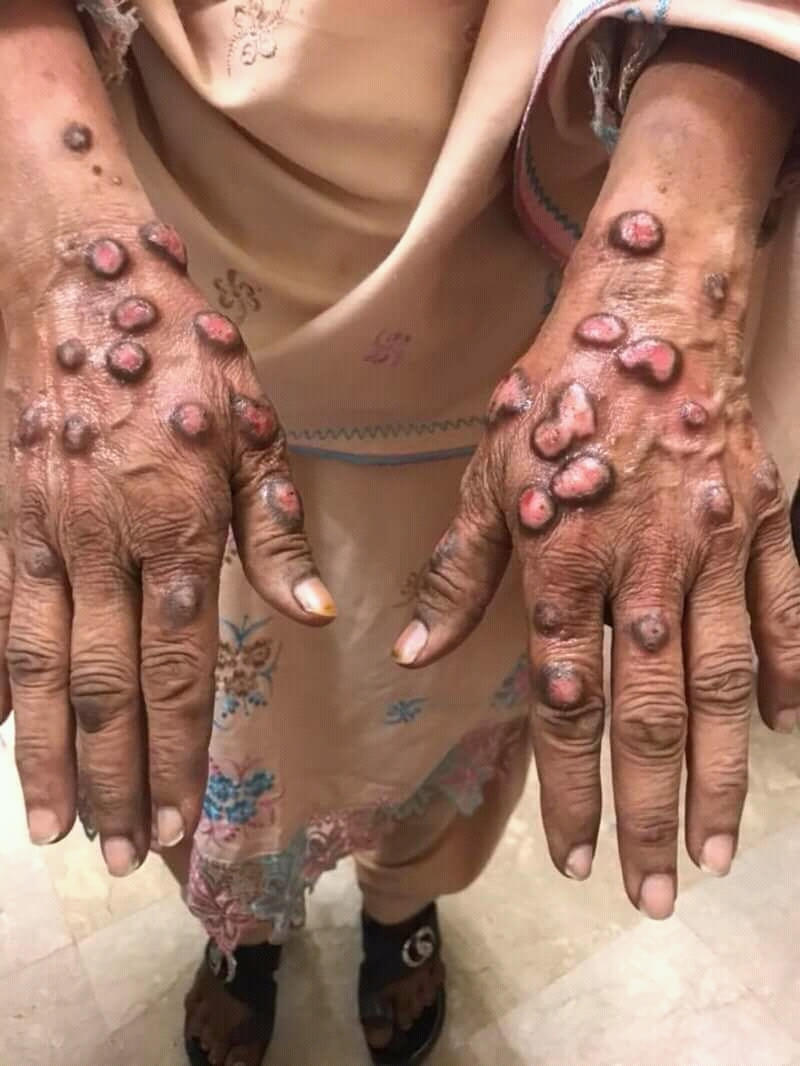
- Nodular lesions on the lateral surface of a patient's hand
- Specialty: Dermatology
- Symptoms: Firm, symmetrically distributed nodules or papules with paroxysmal intense chronic pruritus
- Complications: Anxiety, depression, sleep disturbances, secondary bacterial infection
- Usual onset: Adulthood or advanced age
- Duration: Chronic, refractory, and prone to recurrence
- Types: Classified by lesion count: mild (<20), moderate (20–99), severe (≥100)
- Causes: The interaction of three links: primary epidermal barrier defect, type II immune inflammation, and neural structural remodeling.
- Risk factors: Advanced age, female sex, Black ethnicity, diabetes mellitus, peripheral neuropathy, chronic kidney disease
- Diagnostic method: Morphology of skin lesions (texture, size), distribution pattern (extensor limbs, butterfly sign)
- Differential diagnosis: Dermatitis, Lichen planus, Bullous pemphigoid, Scabies
- Prevention: Avoid scratching and friction, intensive gentle moisturization, avoidance of triggers
- Treatment: Conventional medications, physical therapies, and biologic agents
- Medication: Corticosteroids, immunosuppressive drugs, biologic agents
- Frequency: Global prevalence approximately 0.083%

Prurigo nodularis (PN) is a chronic, inflammatory skin disease characterized by intense pruritus and symmetrically distributed, firm papules or nodules on the skin. The core pathogenesis of PN involves a three-stage model comprising primary epidermal barrier defect, type 2 immune inflammation, and neural structural remodeling.

Clinically, the diagnosis of PN relies on the characteristic morphology of skin lesions, their distinctive anatomical distribution, and the pattern of chronic severe pruritus. Epidemiological data indicate that the global prevalence of PN is approximately 0.083%, predominantly affecting adults and the elderly, with higher incidence rates observed in females and individuals of Black ethnicity.

Treatment of PN follows a multimodal, stepwise approach, ranging from topical corticosteroids and phototherapy to biologic agents targeting the type 2 inflammatory pathway. Because PN is frequently associated with systemic diseases (such as diabetes and renal disease), peripheral neuropathy, and psychiatric comorbidities (anxiety and depression), effective clinical management requires simultaneous addressing of skin lesions, neurological symptoms, and psychosocial factors in order to interrupt the persistent itch-scratch cycle.

== Classification ==
Clinically, the severity of prurigo nodularis is primarily determined by the total number of lesions across the body:

- Mild: Fewer than 20 lesions
- Moderate: 20–99 lesions
- Severe: 100 or more lesions

This is a simplified grading; comprehensive clinical assessment also considers itch intensity and lesion activity.

== Clinical features ==
Diagnosis of prurigo nodularis relies on characteristic lesion morphology, distinctive anatomical distribution, and a pattern of chronic intense pruritus.

The primary lesions are symmetrically distributed, firm, hyperkeratotic papules or nodules ranging from a few millimeters to several centimeters in diameter (commonly defined as ≥0.5 cm firm nodules). They are typically dark red, reddish-brown, or gray-brown. Due to prolonged scratching, lesions often show marked hyperkeratosis, excoriation, central umbilication (crater-like depression), fresh excoriations, hemorrhagic crusts, or exudate. In later stages, adjacent nodules may coalesce into well-demarcated, markedly thickened lichenified plaques.

Lesion distribution correlates with areas reachable by scratching, predominantly affecting the extensor surfaces of the limbs (outer arms and legs), upper back, buttocks, and trunk. The palms, soles, and face are rarely involved. A key diagnostic feature is the butterfly sign: the central upper back between the scapulae remains spared (as it is difficult to reach), creating a striking contrast with the surrounding affected skin. Interlesional skin often shows dryness, hyperpigmentation, or atrophy due to chronic friction.

The associated pruritus is intense, destructive, and refractory, often paroxysmal with burning, stinging, or crawling sensations. It worsens at night and during rest, severely disrupting sleep. Unlike histamine-driven itch, it is not adequately relieved by gentle rubbing; patients frequently scratch vigorously, break the skin, or use tools to induce pain for temporary relief, perpetuating the itch-scratch cycle.

== Epidemiology ==
A systematic review and meta-analysis of 12 studies involving over 430 million people estimated the global pooled prevalence of prurigo nodularis at approximately 0.083%. Most data come from Europe and the United States, so the true worldwide prevalence may be underestimated due to limited studies from other regions.

The disease predominantly affects adults and the elderly. Women are affected more frequently than men, and Black individuals show significantly higher susceptibility (up to three times higher than other ethnic groups).

== Pathophysiology ==
The pathophysiology of Prurigo nodularis (PN)involves three interconnected processes: primary epidermal barrier defect, type 2 immune inflammation, and neural structural remodeling.

=== Primary Epidermal Barrier Defect ===
PN patients have inherent skin barrier defects, including reduced stratum corneum lipid lamellae, decreased filaggrin expression, reduced skin hydration, and increased transepidermal water loss. These changes are present even in non-lesional skin, rendering the skin dry and fragile before scratching begins and predisposing patients to the itch-scratch cycle.

=== Type 2 Inflammation ===
Barrier disruption triggers keratinocytes to release alarmins (TSLP, IL-33, IL-25), activating Th2 cells. These cells then produce IL-4, IL-13, and IL-31 via the JAK-STAT pathway. The cytokines further impair the skin barrier by downregulating filaggrin and ceramides while sensitizing sensory neurons, particularly through IL-31 signaling. Eosinophil-derived neurotoxins exacerbate neurogenic inflammation, creating a vicious itch-scratch cycle.

=== Non-Histaminergic Itch Pathway ===
Chronic pruritus in PN is mainly mediated by non-histaminergic pathways, primarily IL-31 directly activating sensory neurons. This explains the limited efficacy of antihistamines, which cannot block the dominant IL-31-driven itch transmission.

=== Neural Remodeling ===
Prolonged scratching leads to nerve growth factor overexpression, causing dermal nerve hyperplasia and epidermal nerve degeneration. This results in neural hypersensitivity and lowered itch threshold. IL-4/IL-13-induced periostin deposition and fibrosis further consolidate the chronic pruritic state.

Overall, the pathological progression of PN can be divided into three stages: initiation (primary epidermal barrier defect), amplification (type 2 immune inflammation and itch-scratch cycle), and consolidation (neural structural remodeling and non-histaminergic chronic pruritus). The final stage explains why treatment with antihistamines or anti-inflammatory agents alone is often insufficient to achieve a cure. Effective management requires simultaneous intervention targeting neural sensitization and central regulation to successfully interrupt the persistent itch-scratch cycle.

== Treatment ==
Management of prurigo nodularis follows a stepwise, multimodal approach tailored to disease severity.

=== Conventional treatments ===
Topical or intralesional corticosteroids: First-line for mild or localized disease. Long-term use risks skin atrophy and telangiectasia. Systemic corticosteroids or immunosuppressants: Used short-term for widespread flares. Long-term use carries risks of hypertension, diabetes, osteoporosis, infection, and malignancy.

=== Physical therapies ===
Phototherapy (UV light): Modulates local immunity; limited efficacy on thick nodules and carries risks of photoaging and skin cancer.

Cryotherapy: Suitable for small lesions; may cause pain, blistering, infection, or pigmentary changes.

=== Biologic agents ===
Biologics targeting type 2 inflammation are standard for moderate-to-severe disease.

Dupilumab (Dupixent): Blocks IL-4Rα, inhibiting IL-4 and IL-13 signaling. In phase 3 trials, approximately 58–60% of patients achieved significant itch improvement and 45–48% showed clear or almost clear skin by week 24.

Nemolizumab (Nemluvio): Targets IL-31Rα. Provides rapid itch relief (noticeable by week 4) and improves sleep disturbance.

=== Emerging therapies ===
Several JAK inhibitors(e.g., topical ruxolitinib, oral povorcitinib) and novel biologics (anti-OX40, anti-KIT, etc.) are in clinical development.

== Daily care and prevention ==
Strictly avoid scratching and friction to break the itch-scratch cycle and prevent secondary infection. Use short, lukewarm showers; avoid hot water. Apply fragrance-free, gentle moisturizers frequently to restore the skin barrier. Wear loose cotton clothing; avoid wool and irritants. Minimize exposure to heat, dryness, spicy foods, alcohol, and stress.

== Comorbidities ==
Comorbidities in (PN are commonly classified into three categories: systemic diseases, neuropathies, and psychiatric disorders. These conditions often interact bidirectionally with the core pathophysiology of PN.

PN is frequently triggered by external factors such as arthropod bites, medications, or skin dryness, and shows significant associations with diabetes mellitus, peripheral neuropathy, and end-stage renal disease. Notably, a higher proportion of PN patients are overweight or obese, which may be related to underlying metabolic disorders or secondary to long-term severe pruritus, sleep deprivation, and social isolation leading to emotional eating.

Peripheral neuropathy and PN's neural structural remodeling reinforce each other: overexpression of nerve growth factor in PN can worsen pre-existing neuropathy, while damaged nerves can in turn intensify scratching behavior, forming a bidirectional cycle.

On the psychiatric level, chronic sleep deprivation and persistent itch-related discomfort significantly increase the risk of anxiety disorders and depression in PN patients. Mechanistically, elevated IL-6 levels (a pro-inflammatory cytokine that can directly affect central emotional regulation) and reduced serotonin are observed. The latter is closely linked to depression, insomnia, and heightened itch sensitivity. This creates a vicious loop of "inflammation → neural sensitization → sleep disturbance → emotional dysregulation → elevated stress hormones → worsened inflammation," making psychiatric comorbidities not merely psychological consequences but structural drivers of disease persistence.

Effective clinical management requires simultaneous treatment of skin lesions, neurological symptoms, and psychiatric comorbidities to successfully interrupt this multilayered vicious cycle.

== History ==
Prurigo nodularis was first described by Hardaway in 1880.

== See also ==
- Lichen simplex chronicus
- Atopic dermatitis
- Uremic pruritus
- Dermatitis artefacta
- JAK-STAT signaling pathway
