= Nuocyte =

Cell type

The nuocyte is a cell of the innate immune system that plays an important role in type 2 immune responses that are induced in response to helminth worm infection or in conditions such as asthma and atopic disease. Nuocytes are amongst the first cells activated in type 2 immune responses and are thought to play important roles in activating and recruiting other cells types through their production of type 2 cytokines interleukin 4, 5 and 13. Nuocytes have been observed to proliferate in the presence of interleukin 7 (IL-7) in vitro. Nuocytes contribute to the expulsion of helminth worms and to the pathology of colitis and allergic airways disease.

The nuocyte was identified at the same time as several other immune cells that play similar roles in type 2 immunity. These include Natural Helper Cells (NHCs), Innate Helper 2 (Ih2) cells and multi-potent progenitor (MPP) type 2 cells. The exact relationship between these cell types remains contentious but all share a type-2-inducing phenotype. MPP type 2 cells appear to differ from the other populations in that they have a myeloid, rather than lymphoid, origin.

Nuocytes have been shown to have a lymphoid origin and a developmental pathway that is dependent upon the transcription factor RORα and Notch signalling. Pro-T cell progenitors retain nuocyte developmental potential but, unlike T cells, the thymus is dispensable for their development.

== See also ==
- Innate lymphoid cell
