= LMT-28 =

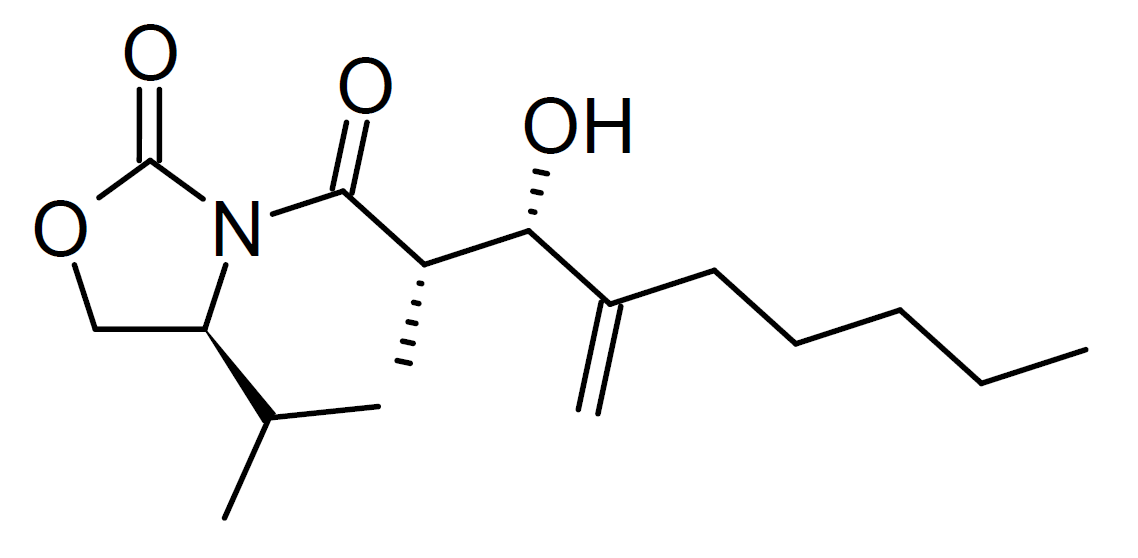

Identifiers
- IUPAC name: (4S)-3-[(2S,3S)-3-hydroxy-2-methyl-4-methylidenenonanoyl]-4-propan-2-yl-1,3-oxazolidin-2-one
- CAS Number: 1239600-18-0
- PubChem CID: 49846977
- ChemSpider: 58824361
- ChEMBL: ChEMBL3765505

Chemical and physical data
- Formula: C_{17}H_{29}NO_{4}
- Molar mass: 311.422 g·mol^{−1}
- 3D model (JSmol): Interactive image
- SMILES: CCCCCC(=C)[C@H]([C@H](C)C(=O)N1[C@H](COC1=O)C(C)C)O
- InChI: InChI=1S/C17H29NO4/c1-6-7-8-9-12(4)15(19)13(5)16(20)18-14(11(2)3)10-22-17(18)21/h11,13-15,19H,4,6-10H2,1-3,5H3/t13-,14+,15+/m0/s1; Key:UDXWSYOXIRPYFK-RRFJBIMHSA-N

LMT-28 is an experimental drug which was the first molecule discovered that acts as an antagonist of IL6R, the receptor for Interleukin-6, and so blocks its activity in the body. Interleukin-6 is a cytokine signalling molecule which plays a key role in inflammation, so blocking IL6R is useful for alleviating a number of disease processes in which inflammation plays a part. Previously it has only been possible to block cytokine activity using biologics such as targeted antibodies which have various disadvantages, so the development of small molecule inhibitors is a considerable advance. LMT-28 is of relatively low potency and is unlikely to be developed as a medicine, but is useful for pharmaceutical research into the processes mediated by IL6R, and as a successful proof of concept it makes it likely that more potent small molecule antagonists for IL6R and other interleukin receptors will be developed in future.

== See also ==
- IL-4-inhibitor-1
- Sarilumab
- Tocilizumab
