= Solitary fibrous tumor =

- Other names: Fibrous tumor of the pleura
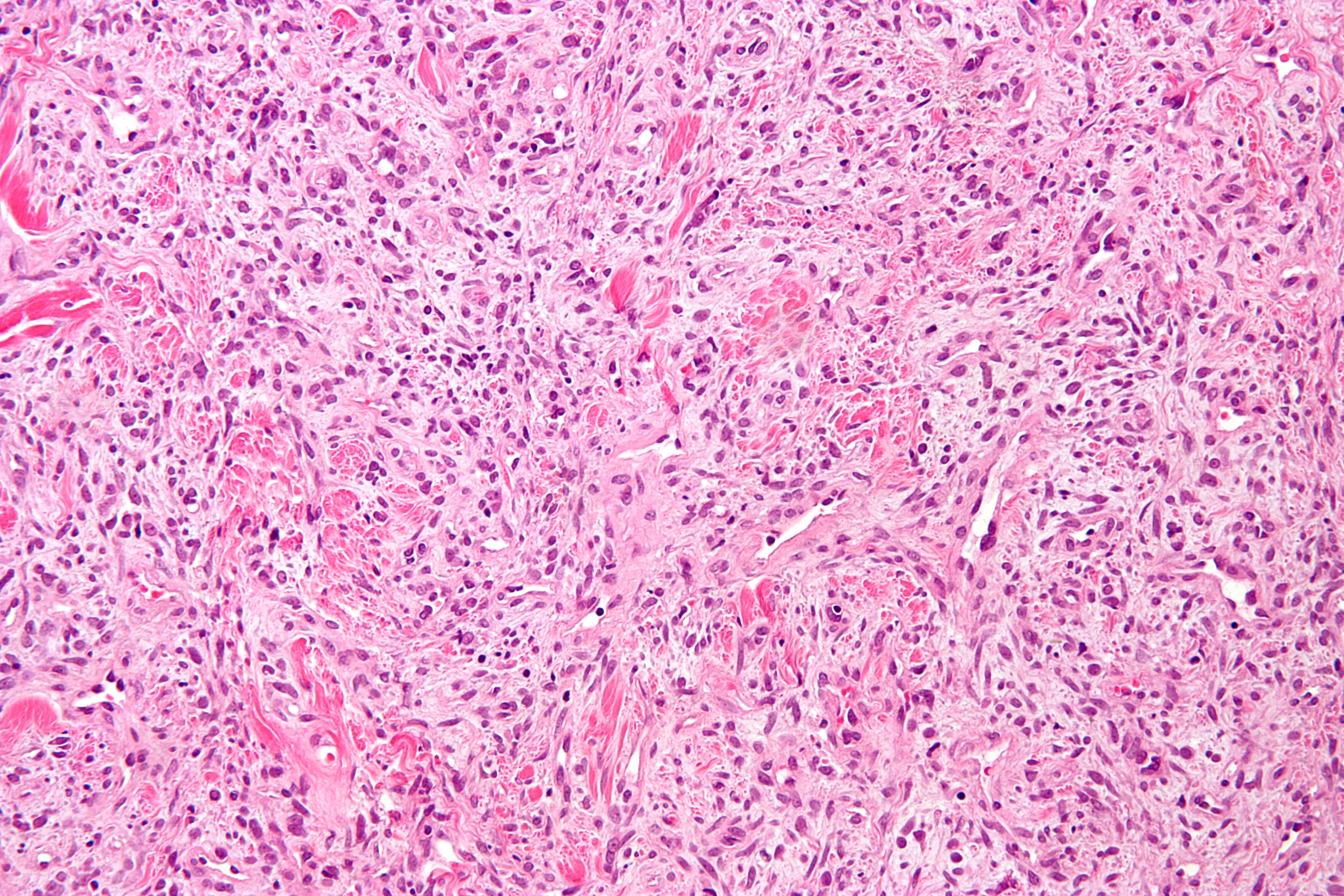
- Micrograph of a solitary fibrous tumor. H&E stain.
- Specialty: Oncology

Solitary fibrous tumor (SFT), also known as fibrous tumor of the pleura, is a rare mesenchymal tumor originating in the pleura or at virtually any site in the soft tissue including the seminal vesicle. Approximately 78% to 88% of SFT's are benign and 12% to 22% are malignant. The World Health Organization (2020) classified SFT as a specific type of tumor in the category of malignant fibroblastic and myofibroblastic tumors.

== Signs and symptoms ==
About 80% of pleural SFTs originate in the visceral pleura, while 20% arise from parietal pleura. Although they are often very large tumors—up to 40 centimetres (16 in) in diameter—over half are asymptomatic at diagnosis. While some researchers have proposed that a SFT occupying at least 40% of the affected hemithorax be considered a "giant solitary fibrous tumor", no such "giant" variant has yet been recognized within the most widely used pleural tumor classification scheme.

== Pathophysiology ==
Recurrent somatic fusions of the two genes, NGFI-A–binding protein 2 (NAB2) and STAT6, located at chromosomal region 12q13, have been identified in solitary fibrous tumors.

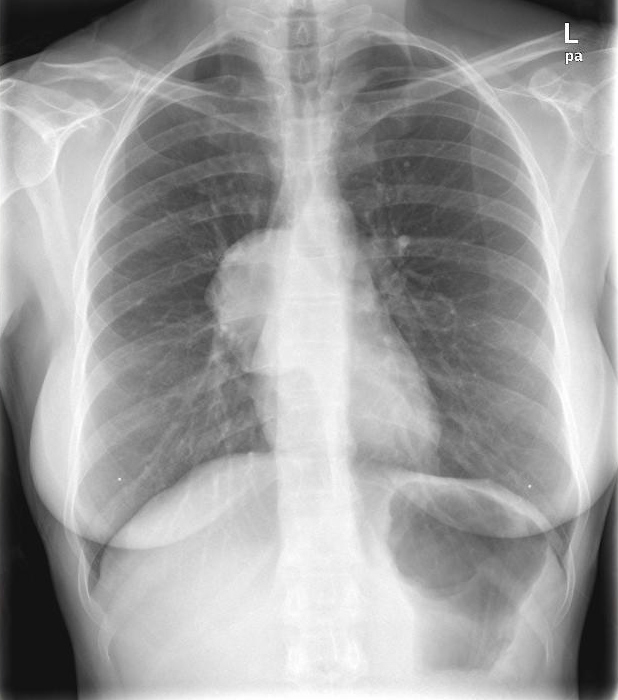
This PA chest radiograph demonstrates an abnormal contour in the right hilar region, with visualization of the pulmonary vessels through the mass (the hilar overlay sign) indicating its posterior mediastinal location. On resection this was found to be a benign solitary fibrous tumor of the pleura.

This axial CT image with intravenous contrast (same patient as in the above chest radiograph) reveals what appears to be a posterior mediastinal mass, which was surgically removed and found to be a solitary fibrous tumor of the pleura.

== Treatment ==
The treatment of choice for both benign and malignant SFT is complete en bloc surgical resection.

== Prognosis ==
Prognosis in benign SFTs is excellent. About 8% will recur after first resection, with the recurrence usually cured after additional surgery.

The prognosis in malignant SFTs is much more guarded. Approximately 63% of patients will have a recurrence of their tumor, of which more than half will succumb to disease progression within two years. Adjuvant chemotherapy and/or radiotherapy in malignant SFT remains controversial.

== History ==
SFT was first mentioned in the scientific literature by Wagner. The first discussion of its clinical and pathological properties was by Klemperer and Rabin. SFTs have also been known as hemangiopericytomas although this term has now been discontinued from WHO tumor classifications.

Over the years pleural SFTs acquired a number of synonyms, including localized fibrous tumor, benign mesothelioma, localized fibrous mesothelioma, submesothelial fibroma, and pleural fibroma. The use of names that include mesothelioma for this tumor is discouraged because of potential confusion with diffuse malignant mesothelioma, a much more serious disease.

== See also ==
- Hemangiopericytoma
- Myopericytoma

== Additional images ==
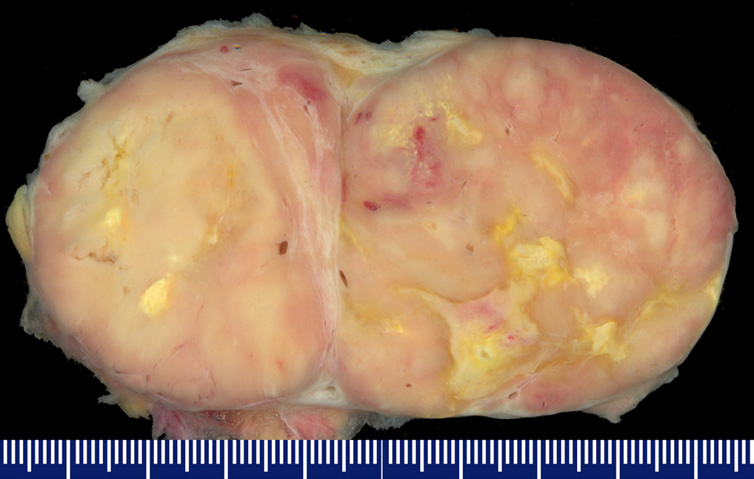
Gross pathology of an atypical solitary fibrous tumor, evidenced by some deeply yellow necrotic areas

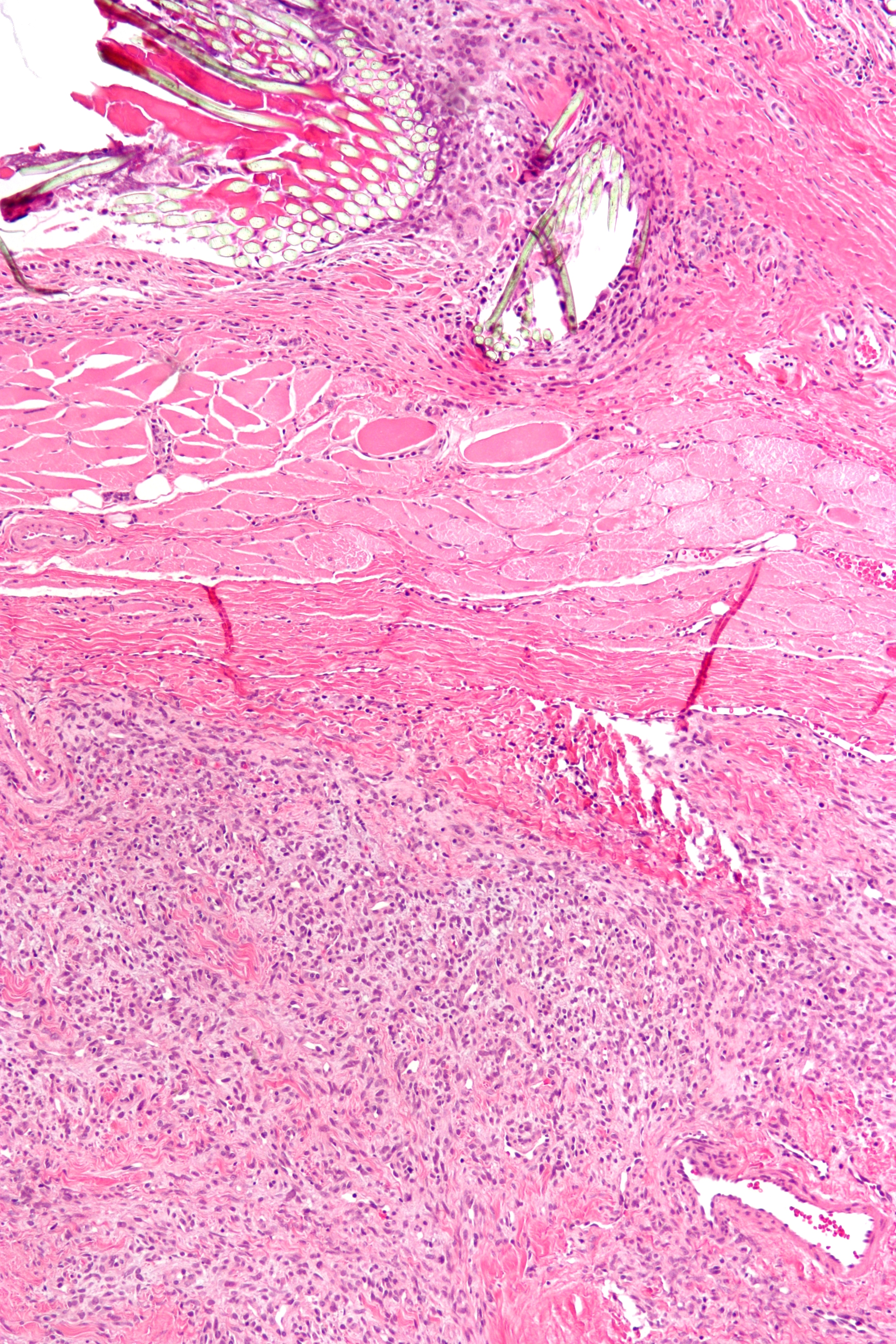
Solitary fibrous tumor - low magnification. H&E stain.

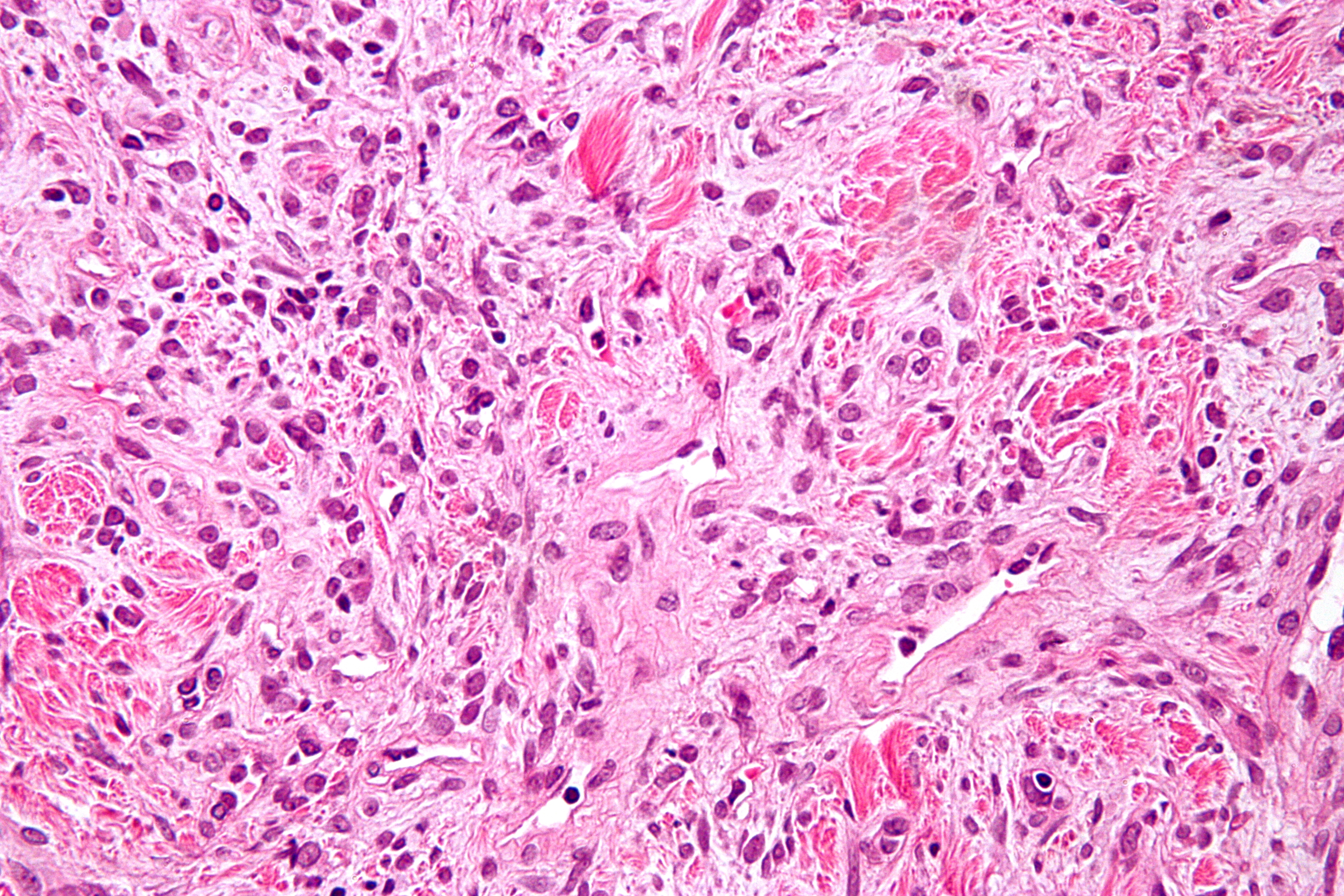
Solitary fibrous tumor - high magnification. H&E stain.
