= Nemolizumab =

Monoclonal antibody

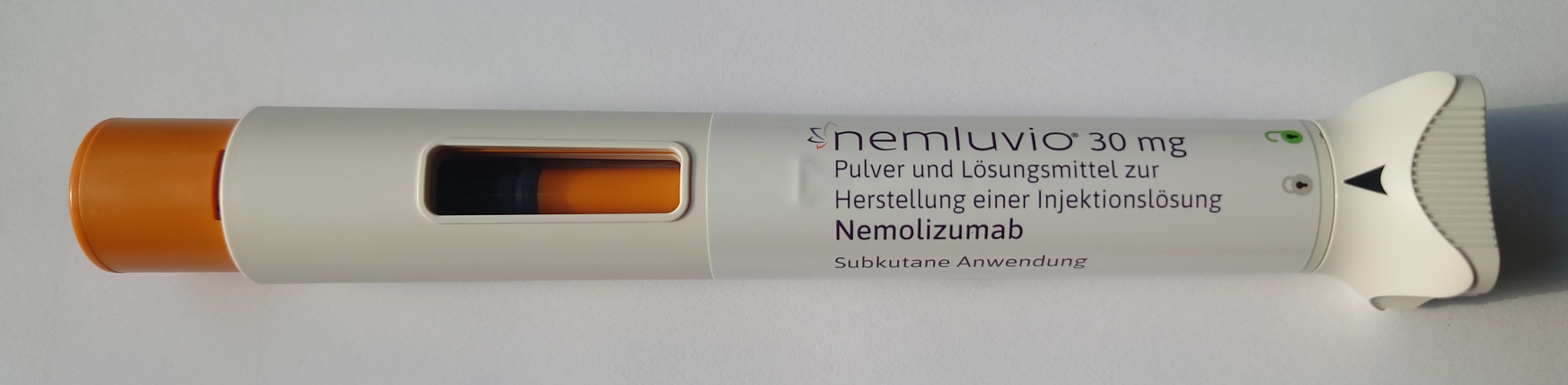

Monoclonal antibody
- Type: Whole antibody
- Source: Humanized
- Target: Interleukin-31 receptor A

Clinical data
- Trade names: Nemluvio
- Other names: CIM-331, CD14152, nemolizumab-ilto
- AHFS/Drugs.com: Monograph
- MedlinePlus: a624059
- License data: US DailyMed: Nemolizumab
- Routes of administration: Subcutaneous injection
- ATC code: D11AH12 (WHO)

Legal status
- Legal status: CA: ℞-only; US: ℞-only; EU: Rx-only

Pharmacokinetic data
- Metabolism: Proteolytic enzymes

Identifiers
- CAS Number: 1476039-58-3
- DrugBank: DB15252
- ChemSpider: none
- UNII: GN465U8B72
- KEGG: D11080

Nemolizumab, sold under the brand name Nemluvio, is a humanized monoclonal antibody used for the treatment of prurigo nodularis and atopic dermatitis. It is a monoclonal antibody that blocks the interleukin-31 receptor A. Nemolizumab is humanized IgG2 monoclonal antibody that inhibits interleukin-31 signaling by binding selectively to interleukin-31 receptor alpha. It is an interleukin-31 receptor antagonist. IL-31 is a cytokine involved in pruritus, inflammation, epidermal dysregulation and fibrosis. By inhibiting IL-31-induced responses, nemolizumab prevents the release of proinflammatory cytokines and chemokines.

Nemolizumab was approved for medical use in the United States in August 2024, and in the European Union in February 2025. The US Food and Drug Administration (FDA) considers it to be a first-in-class medication.

== Medical uses ==
Nemolizumab is indicated for the treatment of adults with prurigo nodularis. In December 2024, the indication for nemolizumab was updated to include the treatment of people twelve years of age and older with moderate-to-severe atopic dermatitis in combination with topical corticosteroids and/or calcineurin inhibitors when the disease is not adequately controlled with topical prescription therapies.

== History ==
Nemolizumab was invented by Chugai, who sold an exclusive license for the drug's development and worldwide marketing (except Japan and Taiwan) to Galderma in 2016.

The US Food and Drug Administration (FDA) approved nemolizumab for the treatment of prurigo nodularis based on evidence from two clinical trials (OLYMPIA 1 and OLYMPIA 2) of 560 participants with prurigo nodularis. The trials were conducted at 132 sites in 16 countries including Austria, Belgium, Canada, Denmark, France, Netherlands, Germany, Hungary, Italy, Poland, South Korea, Spain, Sweden, Switzerland, the United Kingdom, and the United States. The trials included 99 participants inside the United States. Among the 560 enrolled participants, all of them were evaluated for efficacy (intent-to-treat population) and 556 participants were evaluated for safety. In both trials, participants with prurigo nodularis were randomized to receive nemolizumab or placebo. Participants weighing less than 90 kilograms (200 lb) in the nemolizumab group received subcutaneous injections of nemolizumab 60 mg at week 0, followed by 30 mg injections every four weeks. Participants weighing 90 kilograms (200 lb) or more in the nemolizumab group received subcutaneous injections of nemolizumab 60 mg at week 0 and every four weeks.

== Society and culture ==
=== Legal status ===
Nemolizumab was approved for medical use in the United States in August 2024. The FDA granted the application breakthrough therapy designation.

In December 2024, the Committee for Medicinal Products for Human Use of the European Medicines Agency adopted a positive opinion, recommending the granting of a marketing authorization for the medicinal product Nemluvio, intended for the treatment of atopic dermatitis and prurigo nodularis. The applicant for this medicinal product is Galderma International. Nemolizumab was authorized for medical use in the European Union in February 2025.

=== Names ===
Nemolizumab is the international nonproprietary name.

Nemolizumab is sold under the brand name Nemluvio.
