= Lithium succinate =

Chemical compound

Clinical data
- Other names: Lithium succinate dibasic
- AHFS/Drugs.com: Monograph
- ATC code: D11AX04 (WHO)

Identifiers
- IUPAC name: Dilithium butanedioate
- CAS Number: 29126-50-9
- PubChem CID: 10197702
- DrugBank: DB14508
- ChemSpider: 8373202
- UNII: MD64P82Y28
- ChEMBL: ChEMBL3707288
- ECHA InfoCard: 100.163.153

Chemical and physical data
- Formula: C_{4}H_{4}Li_{2}O_{4}
- Molar mass: 129.95 g·mol^{−1}
- 3D model (JSmol): Interactive image
- SMILES: [Li+].[Li+].[O-]C(=O)CCC([O-])=O
- InChI: InChI=1S/C4H6O4.2Li/c5-3(6)1-2-4(7)8;;/h1-2H2,(H,5,6)(H,7,8);;/q;2*+1/p-2; Key:WAHQBNXSPALNEA-UHFFFAOYSA-L

Lithium succinate (C_{4}H_{4}Li_{2}O_{4}), the dilithium salt of succinic acid, is a drug used in the treatment of seborrhoeic dermatitis and proposed for the treatment of anogenital warts.
