= Cendakimab =

Monoclonal antibody
- Type: ?
- Target: Interleukin 13

Clinical data
- Pronunciation: /sɛn.dækˈ.ɪ.mæb/ sen-DAK-i-mab
- Other names: RPC4046; ABT 308; CC-93538
- ATC code: None

Identifiers
- CAS Number: 2151032-62-9
- PubChem SID: 433774518
- DrugBank: DB18427
- UNII: O8R9U9ZUVN
- KEGG: D11843

Chemical and physical data
- Formula: C_{6508}H_{10116}N_{1724}O_{2028}S_{44}
- Molar mass: 146369.20 g·mol^{−1}

Cendakimab (RPC4046; ABT 308; CC-93538) is a monoclonal antibody against interleukin 13. It is developed by Bristol Myers Squibb for eosinophilic esophagitis and atopic dermatitis.
