= ATC code D11 =

ATC code D11 Other dermatological preparations is a therapeutic subgroup of the Anatomical Therapeutic Chemical Classification System, a system of alphanumeric codes developed by the World Health Organization (WHO) for the classification of drugs and other medical products. Subgroup D11 is part of the anatomical group D Dermatologicals.

Codes for veterinary use (ATCvet codes) can be created by placing the letter Q in front of the human ATC code: for example, QD11. ATCvet codes without corresponding human ATC codes are cited with the leading Q in the following list.
National versions of the ATC classification may include additional codes not present in this list, which follows the WHO version.

== D11A Other dermatological preparations ==
=== D11AA Antihidrotics ===
D11AA01 Glycopyrronium
D11AA02 Sofpironium bromide

=== D11AC Medicated shampoos ===
D11AC01 Cetrimide
D11AC02 Cadmium compounds
D11AC03 Selenium compounds
D11AC06 Povidone-iodine
D11AC08 Sulfur compounds
D11AC09 Xenysalate
D11AC30 Others

=== D11AE Androgens for topical use ===
D11AE01 Metandienone

=== D11AF Wart and anti-corn preparations ===
Empty group

=== D11AH Agents for dermatitis, excluding corticosteroids ===
D11AH01 Tacrolimus
D11AH02 Pimecrolimus
D11AH03 Cromoglicic acid
D11AH04 Alitretinoin
D11AH05 Dupilumab
D11AH06 Crisaborole
D11AH07 Tralokinumab
D11AH08 Abrocitinib
D11AH09 Ruxolitinib
D11AH10 Lebrikizumab
D11AH11 Delgocitinib
D11AH12 Nemolizumab
QD11AH90 Oclacitinib
QD11AH91 Lokivetmab
QD11AH92 Ilunocitinib
QD11AH93 Atinvicitinib

=== D11AX Other dermatologicals ===
D11AX01 Minoxidil
D11AX02 Gamolenic acid
D11AX03 Calcium gluconate
D11AX04 Lithium succinate
D11AX05 Magnesium sulfate
D11AX06 Mequinol
D11AX08 Tiratricol
D11AX09 Oxaceprol
D11AX10 Finasteride
D11AX11 Hydroquinone
D11AX12 Pyrithione zinc
D11AX13 Monobenzone
D11AX16 Eflornithine
D11AX18 Diclofenac
D11AX21 Brimonidine
D11AX22 Ivermectin
D11AX23 Aminobenzoate potassium
D11AX24 Deoxycholic acid
D11AX25 Hydrogen peroxide
D11AX26 Caffeine
D11AX27 Oxymetazoline
D11AX52 Gamolenic acid, combinations
D11AX57 Collagen, combinations
QD11AX90 Benzoylperoxide
