= Interleukin-6 receptor =

Protein found in humans

IL6R
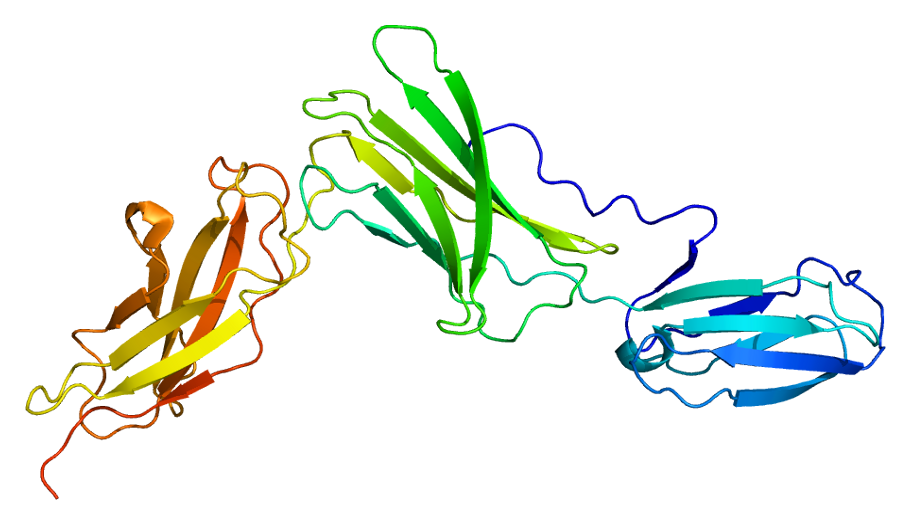

Identifiers
- Aliases: IL6R, CD126, IL-6R-1, IL-6RA, IL6Q, IL6RA, IL6RQ, gp80, Interleukin-6 receptor, interleukin 6 receptor
- External IDs: OMIM: 147880; MGI: 105304; GeneCards: IL6R
Available structures
PDB	Ortholog search: PDBe RCSB
PDB	List of PDB id codes 1N26, 1P9M, 2ARW

Gene location (Human)
Chr.	Chromosome 1 (human)
Band	1q21.3	Start	154,405,193 bp
Band	1q21.3	End	154,469,450 bp

Gene location (Mouse)
Chr.	Chromosome 3 (mouse)
Band	3 F1|3 39.19 cM	Start	89,771,366 bp
Band	3 F1|3 39.19 cM	End	89,820,503 bp
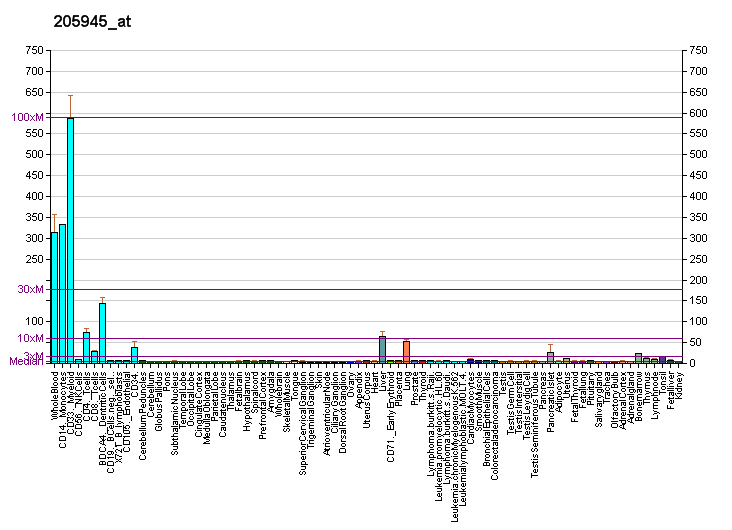

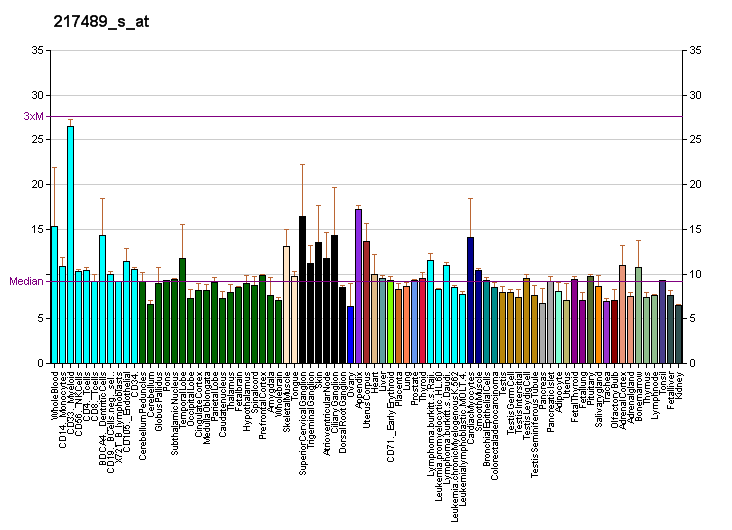
RNA expression pattern
Bgee	Human / Mouse (ortholog); Top expressed in: blood; monocyte; right lobe of liver; gastrocnemius muscle; granulocyte; trabecular bone; bone marrow cell; synovial joint; saphenous vein; gastric mucosa / Top expressed in: granulocyte; blood; islet of Langerhans; decidua; muscle of thigh; lip; left lobe of liver; tibiofemoral joint; esophagus; lymph node; More reference expression data
BioGPS	More reference expression data
Gene ontology
Molecular function	ciliary neurotrophic factor receptor activity; protein homodimerization activity; interleukin-6 receptor binding; protein binding; cytokine receptor activity; enzyme binding; ciliary neurotrophic factor binding; interleukin-6 receptor activity; interleukin-6 binding; interleukin-12 receptor binding; growth factor activity; cytokine binding; interleukin-12 alpha subunit binding; interleukin-23 receptor binding
Cellular component	integral component of membrane; membrane; plasma membrane; extracellular region; basolateral plasma membrane; apical plasma membrane; interleukin-6 receptor complex; ciliary neurotrophic factor receptor complex; extracellular space; cell surface; external side of plasma membrane; receptor complex; interleukin-12 complex; interleukin-23 complex
Biological process	positive regulation of activation of Janus kinase activity; response to cytokine; hepatic immune response; extrinsic apoptotic signaling pathway; monocyte chemotaxis; ciliary neurotrophic factor-mediated signaling pathway; positive regulation of leukocyte chemotaxis; negative regulation of interleukin-8 production; positive regulation of osteoblast differentiation; defense response to Gram-negative bacterium; acute-phase response; positive regulation of NF-kappaB transcription factor activity; positive regulation of cell population proliferation; positive regulation of interleukin-6 production; positive regulation of peptidyl-tyrosine phosphorylation; positive regulation of chemokine production; neutrophil mediated immunity; negative regulation of collagen biosynthetic process; endocrine pancreas development; positive regulation of MAPK cascade; positive regulation of smooth muscle cell proliferation; defense response to Gram-positive bacterium; positive regulation of tyrosine phosphorylation of STAT protein; cytokine-mediated signaling pathway; interleukin-6-mediated signaling pathway; positive regulation of T-helper 1 type immune response; regulation of signaling receptor activity; positive regulation of interferon-gamma production; positive regulation of natural killer cell activation; positive regulation of activated T cell proliferation; positive regulation of lymphocyte proliferation; positive regulation of NK T cell activation; positive regulation of glomerular mesangial cell proliferation
Sources:Amigo / QuickGO
Orthologs
Databases	NCBI: entry; OMA: entry
Species	Human	Mouse
Entrez	3570	16194
Ensembl	ENSG00000160712	ENSMUSG00000027947
UniProt	P08887	P22272
RefSeq (mRNA)	NM_000565; NM_001206866; NM_181359	NM_010559; NM_001310676
RefSeq (protein)	NP_000556; NP_001193795; NP_852004; NP_001369698; NP_001369699 NP_001369700; NP_001369701; NP_001369702; NP_001369703	NP_001297605; NP_034689
Location (UCSC)	Chr 1: 154.41 – 154.47 Mb	Chr 3: 89.77 – 89.82 Mb
PubMed search
- Wikidata
View/Edit Human	View/Edit Mouse

Interleukin 6 receptor (IL6R) also known as CD126 (Cluster of Differentiation 126) is a type I cytokine receptor.

== Function ==
Interleukin 6 (IL6) is a potent pleiotropic cytokine that regulates cell growth and differentiation and plays an important role in immune response. Dysregulated production of IL6 and this receptor are implicated in the pathogenesis of many diseases, such as multiple myeloma, autoimmune diseases and prostate cancer.

In melanocytes IL6R gene expression may be regulated by MITF.

== Structure ==
The IL6 receptor is a protein complex consisting of an IL-6 receptor subunit (IL6R) and interleukin 6 signal transducer Glycoprotein 130. IL6R also denotes the human gene encoding this subunit. Alternatively spliced transcript variants encoding distinct isoforms have been reported. IL6R subunit is also shared by many other cytokines.

== Interactions ==
Interleukin-6 receptor has been shown to interact with Interleukin 6 and ciliary neurotrophic factor.

== See also ==
- Cluster of differentiation
- Anti-IL-6
  - Tocilizumab, a monoclonal antibody against IL6R
  - Sarilumab, a monoclonal antibody against IL6R
  - LMT-28, a small molecule antagonist of IL6R
