= Atinvicitinib =

Medication

Clinical data
- ATCvet code: QD11AH93 (WHO)

Identifiers
- IUPAC name: 1-[(3R,4S)-4-cyanooxan-3-yl]-3-[(2-fluoro-6-methoxypyridin-4-yl)amino]pyrazole-4-carboxamide
- CAS Number: 2169273-59-8
- PubChem CID: 135138184
- ChemSpider: 76784061
- UNII: C238YE66P2
- ChEMBL: ChEMBL4066193

Chemical and physical data
- Formula: C_{16}H_{17}FN_{6}O_{3}
- Molar mass: 360.349 g·mol^{−1}
- 3D model (JSmol): Interactive image
- SMILES: COc1cc(Nc2nn([C@H]3COCC[C@@H]3C#N)cc2C(N)=O)cc(F)n1
- InChI: InChI=1S/C16H17FN6O3/c1-25-14-5-10(4-13(17)21-14)20-16-11(15(19)24)7-23(22-16)12-8-26-3-2-9(12)6-18/h4-5,7,9,12H,2-3,8H2,1H3,(H2,19,24)(H,20,21,22)/t9-,12+/m1/s1; Key:PRQMBGDYXWVEHE-SKDRFNHKSA-N

Atinvicitinib is a veterinary medicinal product under investigation for the treatment of atopic dermatitis in dogs. Atinvicitinib is a selective Janus kinase (JAK) inhibitor, highly selective for Janus kinase 1 (JAK1). It inhibits the function of a variety of cytokines involved in itch and inflammation, as well as cytokines involved in allergy, that are dependent on JAK1 enzyme activity. Reduction of allergy mediated inflammation, which is dependent on JAK1 enzyme activity, leads to a reduction of inflammation associated white blood cell counts (within the reference range).

== Society and culture ==
=== Legal status ===
In June 2025, the Committee for Veterinary Medicinal Products of the European Medicines Agency adopted a positive opinion, recommending the granting of a marketing authorization for the veterinary medicinal product Numelvi, tablets, intended for dogs. The applicant for this veterinary medicinal product is Intervet International B.V.

=== Names ===
Atinvicitinib is the international nonproprietary name.
