= STAT6 =

Protein and coding gene in humans

Identifiers
- Aliases: STAT6, D12S1644, IL-4-STAT, STAT6B, STAT6C, signal transducer and activator of transcription 6
- External IDs: OMIM: 601512; MGI: 103034; GeneCards: STAT6
Available structures
PDB	Ortholog search: PDBe RCSB
PDB	List of PDB id codes 1OJ5, 4Y5W, 4Y5U

Gene location (Human)
Chr.	Chromosome 12 (human)
Band	12q13.3	Start	57,095,408 bp
Band	12q13.3	End	57,132,139 bp

Gene location (Mouse)
Chr.	Chromosome 10 (mouse)
Band	10 D3|10 74.59 cM	Start	127,478,855 bp
Band	10 D3|10 74.59 cM	End	127,496,826 bp
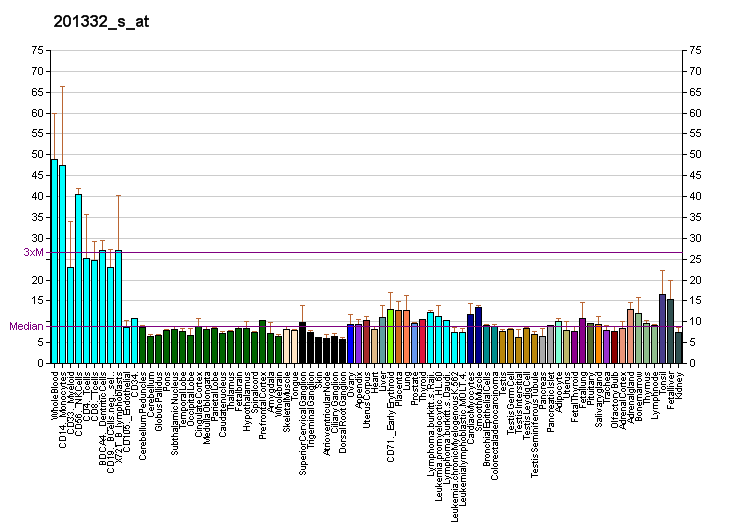

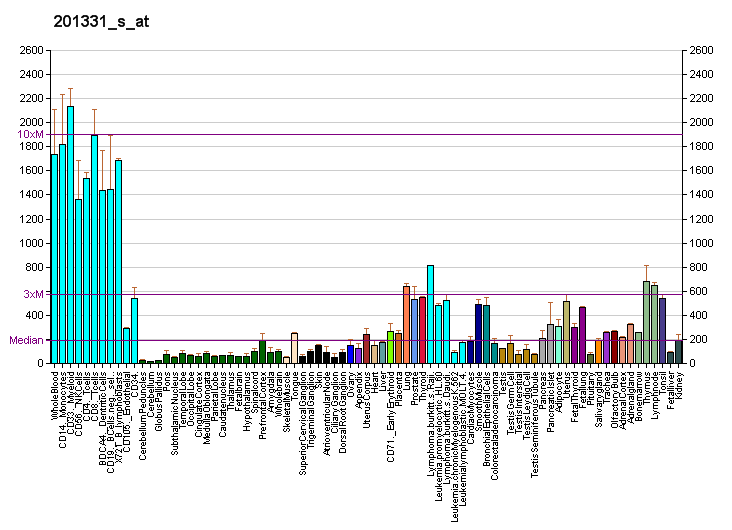
RNA expression pattern
Bgee	Human / Mouse (ortholog); Top expressed in: granulocyte; right ovary; left ovary; canal of the cervix; spleen; gastric mucosa; right adrenal cortex; right uterine tube; left uterine tube; body of uterus / Top expressed in: granulocyte; lumbar spinal ganglion; mesenteric lymph nodes; ascending aorta; aortic valve; thymus; spleen; lip; stroma of bone marrow; esophagus; More reference expression data
BioGPS	More reference expression data
Gene ontology
Molecular function	identical protein binding; sequence-specific DNA binding; protein phosphatase binding; DNA binding; protein binding; DNA-binding transcription factor activity; RNA polymerase II transcription regulatory region sequence-specific DNA binding; DNA-binding transcription activator activity, RNA polymerase II-specific; RNA polymerase II cis-regulatory region sequence-specific DNA binding; DNA-binding transcription factor activity, RNA polymerase II-specific
Cellular component	nucleus; nucleoplasm; membrane raft; cytoplasm; cytosol; nuclear membrane
Biological process	regulation of transcription by RNA polymerase II; T-helper 1 cell lineage commitment; regulation of cell population proliferation; response to cytokine; interleukin-4-mediated signaling pathway; regulation of transcription, DNA-templated; cellular response to hydrogen peroxide; mammary gland epithelial cell proliferation; cellular response to reactive nitrogen species; positive regulation of type I interferon production; positive regulation of isotype switching to IgE isotypes; mammary gland morphogenesis; negative regulation of type 2 immune response; negative regulation of transcription by RNA polymerase II; signal transduction; transcription, DNA-templated; positive regulation of transcription by RNA polymerase II; transcription by RNA polymerase II; cytokine-mediated signaling pathway; positive regulation of cold-induced thermogenesis; defense response; receptor signaling pathway via JAK-STAT; response to peptide hormone; growth hormone receptor signaling pathway via JAK-STAT
Sources:Amigo / QuickGO
Orthologs
Databases	NCBI: entry; OMA: entry
Species	Human	Mouse
Entrez	6778	20852
Ensembl	ENSG00000166888	ENSMUSG00000002147
UniProt	P42226	P52633
RefSeq (mRNA)	NM_001178078; NM_001178079; NM_001178080; NM_001178081; NM_003153	NM_009284
RefSeq (protein)	NP_001171549; NP_001171550; NP_001171551; NP_001171552; NP_003144	NP_033310
Location (UCSC)	Chr 12: 57.1 – 57.13 Mb	Chr 10: 127.48 – 127.5 Mb
PubMed search
- Wikidata
View/Edit Human	View/Edit Mouse

Signal transducer and activator of transcription 6 (STAT6) is a transcription factor that belongs to the Signal Transducer and Activator of Transcription (STAT) family of proteins. The proteins of STAT family transmit signals from a receptor complex to the nucleus and activate gene expression. Similarly as other STAT family proteins, STAT6 is also activated by growth factors and cytokines. STAT6 is mainly activated by cytokines interleukin-4 and interleukin-13.

== Gene ==
In the human genome, STAT6 protein is encoded by the STAT6 gene, located on the chromosome 12q13.3-q14.1. The gene encompasses over 19 kb and consists of 23 exons.

== Structure ==
STAT6 shares structural similarity with the other STAT proteins and is composed of the N-terminal domain, DNA binding domain, SH3- like domain, SH2 domain and transactivation domain (TAD).

== Regulation ==
STAT proteins are activated by the Janus family (JAKs) tyrosine kinases in response to cytokine exposure. STAT6 is activated by cytokines interleukin-4 (IL-4), and interleukin-13 (IL-13) with their receptors that both contain the α subunit of the IL-4 receptor (IL-4Rα). Tyrosine phosporylation of STAT6 after stimulation by IL-4 results in the formation of STAT6 homodimers that bind specific DNA elements via a DNA-binding domain.

== Function ==
STAT6-mediated signaling pathway is required for the development of T-helper type 2 (Th2) cells and Th2 immune response. Expression of Th2 cytokines, including IL-4, IL-13, and IL-5, was reduced in STAT6-deficient mice. STAT 6 protein is crucial in IL4 mediated biological responses. It was found that STAT6 induce the expression of BCL2L1/BCL-X(L), which is responsible for the anti-apoptotic activity of IL4. IL-4 stimulates the phosphorylation of IL-4 receptor, which recruits cytosolic STAT6 by its SH2 domain and STAT6 is phosphorylated on tyrosine 641 (Y641) by JAK1, which results in the dimerization and nuclear translocation of STAT6 to activate target genes. Knockout studies in mice suggested the roles of this gene in differentiation of T helper 2 (Th2), expression of cell surface markers, and class switch of immunoglobulins.

Activation of STAT6 signaling pathway is necessary in macrophage function, and is required for the M2 subtype activation of macrophages. STAT6 protein also regulates other transcription factor as Gata3, which is important regulator of Th2 differentiation. STAT6 is also required for the development of IL-9-secreting T cells.

== Clinical significance ==
STAT6 plays a critical role in Th2 lung inflammatory responses including clearance of parasitic infections and in the pathogenesis of asthma. Th2-cell derived cytokines as IL-4 and IL-13 induce the production of IgE which is a major mediator in allergic response. Association studies searching for relation of polymorphisms in STAT6 with IgE level or asthma discovered a few polymorphisms significantly associated with examined traits. Only two polymorphisms showed repeatedly significant clinical association and/or functional effect on STAT6 function (GT repeats in exon 1 and rs324011 polymorphism in intron 2).

- Gene fusion
  - Recurrent somatic fusions of the two genes, NGFI-A–binding protein 2 (NAB2) and STAT6, located at chromosomal region 12q13, have been identified in solitary fibrous tumors.
- Amplification
  - STAT6 is amplified in a subset of dedifferentiated liposarcoma.

== Interactions ==
STAT6 has been shown to interact with:

- CREB-binding protein,
- EP300,
- IRF4,
- NFKB1,
- Nuclear receptor coactivator 1,
- SND1, and
- Retinoblastoma protein.

== See also ==
- Interleukin 4
