= NAB2 =

Protein-coding gene in the species Homo sapiens

Identifiers
- Aliases: NAB2, MADER, NGFI-A binding protein 2
- External IDs: OMIM: 602381; MGI: 107563; GeneCards: NAB2

Gene location (Human)
Chr.	Chromosome 12 (human)
Band	12q13.3	Start	57,089,043 bp
Band	12q13.3	End	57,095,476 bp

Gene location (Mouse)
Chr.	Chromosome 10 (mouse)
Band	10 D3|10 74.6 cM	Start	127,496,787 bp
Band	10 D3|10 74.6 cM	End	127,504,437 bp
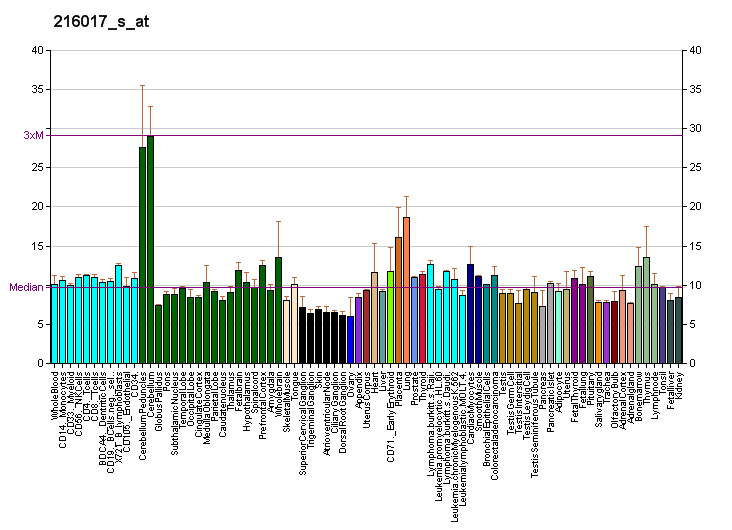

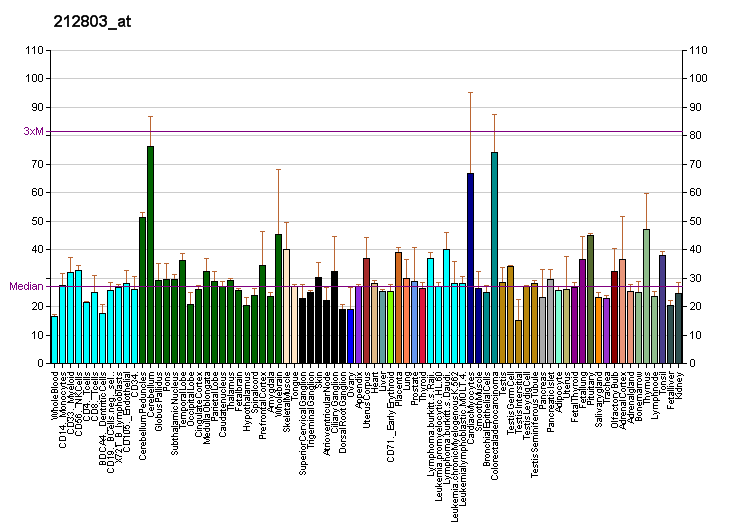
RNA expression pattern
Bgee	Human / Mouse (ortholog); Top expressed in: right hemisphere of cerebellum; left ovary; right ovary; popliteal artery; canal of the cervix; tibial arteries; left uterine tube; Descending thoracic aorta; body of uterus; anterior pituitary / Top expressed in: cerebellar vermis; lobe of cerebellum; lip; calvaria; external carotid artery; internal carotid artery; Gonadal ridge; superior frontal gyrus; olfactory tubercle; dentate gyrus of hippocampal formation granule cell; More reference expression data
BioGPS	More reference expression data
Gene ontology
Molecular function	transcription factor binding; protein binding; transcription corepressor activity; identical protein binding; transcription coregulator activity
Cellular component	nucleus
Biological process	Schwann cell differentiation; myelination; negative regulation of transcription by RNA polymerase III; cell population proliferation; negative regulation of transcription, DNA-templated; regulation of transcription, DNA-templated; endochondral ossification; regulation of epidermis development; transcription, DNA-templated; nervous system development; positive regulation of tau-protein kinase activity
Sources:Amigo / QuickGO
Orthologs
Databases	NCBI: entry; OMA: entry
Species	Human	Mouse
Entrez	4665	17937
Ensembl	ENSG00000166886	ENSMUSG00000025402
UniProt	Q15742	Q61127
RefSeq (mRNA)	NM_005967; NM_001330305	NM_001122895; NM_008668
RefSeq (protein)	NP_001317234; NP_005958	NP_001116367; NP_032694
Location (UCSC)	Chr 12: 57.09 – 57.1 Mb	Chr 10: 127.5 – 127.5 Mb
PubMed search
- Wikidata
View/Edit Human	View/Edit Mouse

NGFI-A-binding protein 2 also known as EGR-1-binding protein 2 or melanoma-associated delayed early response protein (MADER) is a protein that in humans is encoded by the NAB2 gene.

== Function ==
This gene encodes a member of the family of NGFI-A binding (NAB) proteins, which function in the nucleus to repress or activate transcription induced by some members of the EGR (early growth response) family of transactivators. NAB proteins can homo- or hetero-multimerize with other EGR or NAB proteins through a conserved N-terminal domain, and repress transcription through two partially redundant C-terminal domains. Transcriptional repression by the encoded protein is mediated in part by interactions with the nucleosome remodeling and deacetylase (NuRD) complex. Alternatively spliced transcript variants have been described, but their biological validity has not been determined.

== Pathology ==
Recurrent somatic fusions of the two genes, NGFI-A–binding protein 2 (NAB2) and STAT6, located at chromosomal region 12q13, have been identified in solitary fibrous tumors.
