= Sarilumab =

Human monoclonal antibody medication

Monoclonal antibody
- Type: Whole antibody
- Source: Human
- Target: IL-6R

Clinical data
- Trade names: Kevzara
- AHFS/Drugs.com: Monograph
- MedlinePlus: a617032
- License data: US DailyMed: Sarilumab
- Routes of administration: Subcutaneous
- ATC code: L04AC14 (WHO)

Legal status
- Legal status: AU: S4 (Prescription only); CA: ℞-only; US: ℞-only; EU: Rx-only

Pharmacokinetic data
- Bioavailability: 80%
- Metabolism: likely proteases
- Elimination half-life: 21 days (steady-state, estimated)

Identifiers
- CAS Number: 1189541-98-7
- ChemSpider: none
- UNII: NU90V55F8I
- KEGG: D10161

Chemical and physical data
- Formula: C_{6388}H_{9918}N_{1718}O_{1998}S_{44}
- Molar mass: 144164.28 g·mol^{−1}

Sarilumab, sold under the brand name Kevzara, is a human monoclonal antibody medication against the interleukin-6 receptor. Regeneron Pharmaceuticals and Sanofi developed the drug for the treatment of rheumatoid arthritis (RA), for which it received US FDA approval on 22 May 2017 and European Medicines Agency approval on 23 June 2017.

Development in ankylosing spondylitis has been suspended after the drug failed to show clinical benefit over methotrexate in a phase II trial.

== Medical uses ==
Sarilumab is used for the treatment of moderately to severely active rheumatoid arthritis in people who have not responded to, or did not tolerate, more conventional treatments. It can be used alone or in combination with methotrexate or other disease-modifying antirheumatic drugs (DMARDs).

== Contraindications ==
In the European Union, sarilumab is contraindicated in people with active, severe infections. While this is not listed as a contraindication under the US FDA approval, there is a boxed warning that recommends testing for hidden tuberculosis infection before treatment and monitoring for signs of an infection during therapy with sarilumab.

== Side effects ==
The MONARCH trial suggested a significantly higher incidence of neutropenia in patients receiving 200 mg sarilumab every 2 weeks, compared to patients being treated with adalimumab (13.6% vs 0.5%). However, infection rates were similar between both groups (28.8% vs 27.7%).

Other common side effects that occurred in 1% to 10% of patients included thrombocytopenia (low platelet count), infections of the upper respiratory tract and the urinary tract, oral herpes, hyperlipidaemia, and injection site reactions such as pain or redness.

== Clinical trials ==
=== Rheumatoid arthritis ===
On 15 May 2013, both companies announced that 2 new trials were starting (COMPARE and ASCERTAIN) and the first patients had already been enrolled.

In June 2015, a phase III trial (with methotrexate) for RA reported meeting its three coprimary endpoints.

In November 2015, the SARIL-RA-TARGET trial reported good results (meeting both its coprimary end points).

In November 2016, the MONARCH phase III trial comparing sarilimab to adalimumab (an anti-TNF) found sarilumab superior at reducing the DAS28-ESR score in patients with RA after 24 weeks.

In July 2019, a multi-center trial was launched to study 'Sarilumab in Patients With Glucocorticoid-Dependent Sarcoidosis.'

== History ==
In October 2016, the U.S. Food and Drug Administration (FDA) refused approval for marketing as a treatment for rheumatoid arthritis due to good manufacturing practice (GMP) violations. The drug was eventually approved by the FDA on 22 May 2017.

== Research ==
=== COVID-19 ===
A study of 420 patients was halted in September 2020, due to lack of demonstrated effectiveness in treating COVID-19 symptoms.

On 7 January 2021, following results from the REMAP-CAP trial, Tocilizumab and Sarilumab were added to the UK recommended list for COVID-19 treatment, the number needed to treat is 12, meaning for every 12 intensive care unit patients treated 1 additional person survives compared to treatment as normal, also speeding up patients' recovery and reducing the length of time that critically-ill patients need to spend in intensive care by about a week.

Tocilizumab seems to be more beneficial, whereas the clinical efficacy of Sarilumab has not been established as data on decreased mortality was often not significant. The number of trials did not allow for the identification of a specific patient subset that benefits the most from Sarilumab treatment, yet (May 2022). A study published in March 2023, also failed to demonstrate the efficacy of Sarilumab to treat severe COVID-19.
