= Interleukin 13 receptor, alpha 1 =

Protein-coding gene in the species Homo sapiens

IL13RA1
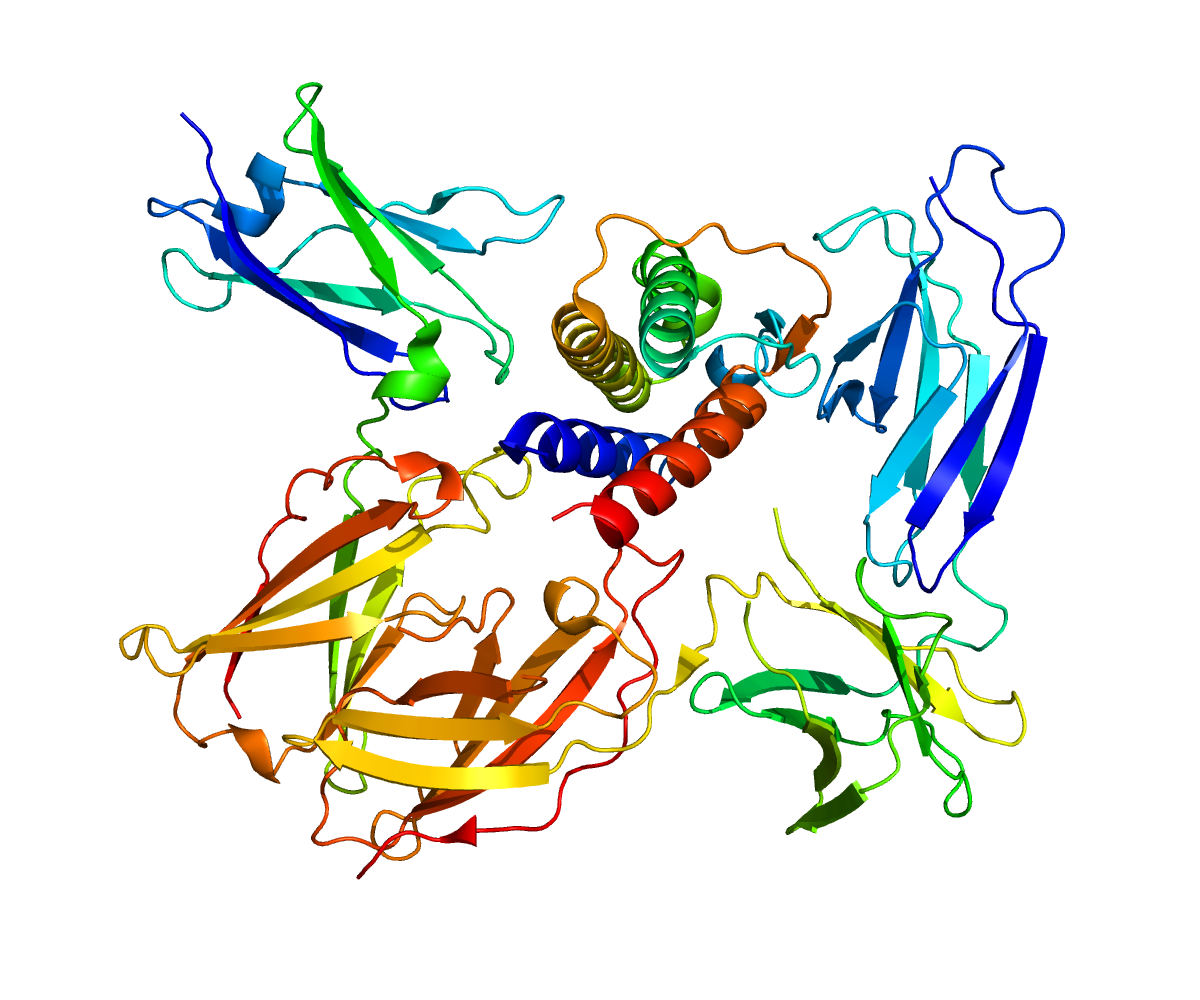

Identifiers
- Aliases: IL13RA1, CD213A1, IL-13Ra, NR4, CT19, interleukin 13 receptor subunit alpha 1
- External IDs: OMIM: 300119; MGI: 105052; GeneCards: IL13RA1
Available structures
PDB	Ortholog search: PDBe RCSB
PDB	List of PDB id codes 3BPN, 3BPO, 4HWB, 5E4E

Gene location (Human)
Chr.	X chromosome (human)
Band	Xq24	Start	118,727,133 bp
Band	Xq24	End	118,794,535 bp

Gene location (Mouse)
Chr.	X chromosome (mouse)
Band	X A3.3|X 20.49 cM	Start	35,375,763 bp
Band	X A3.3|X 20.49 cM	End	35,434,912 bp
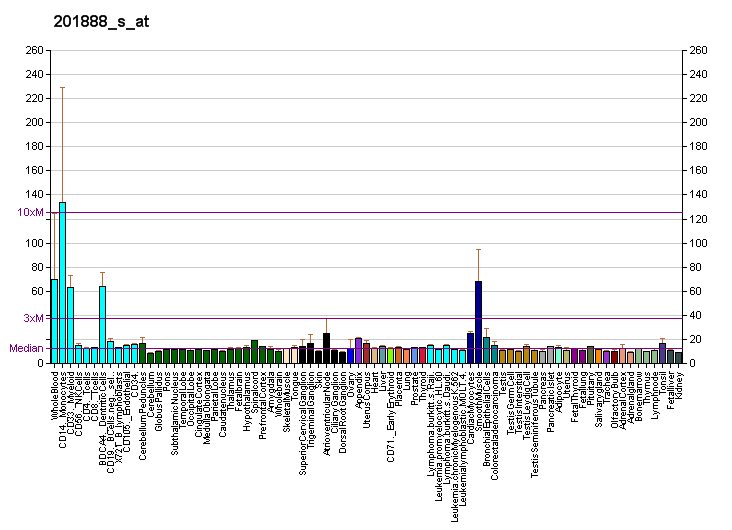

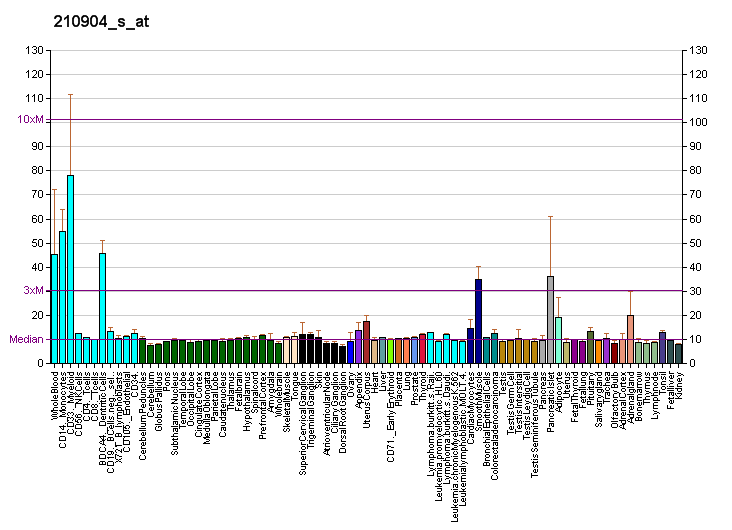

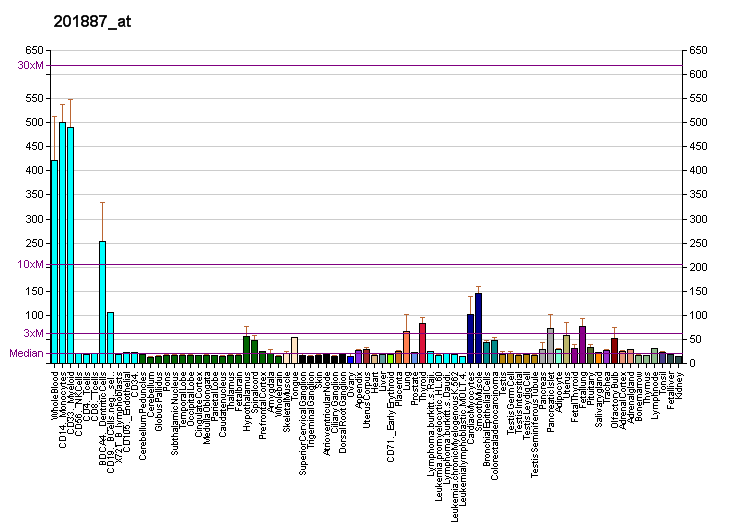
RNA expression pattern
Bgee	Human / Mouse (ortholog); Top expressed in: gingival epithelium; Achilles tendon; parietal pleura; visceral pleura; synovial joint; germinal epithelium; epithelium of nasopharynx; rectum; monocyte; mucosa of sigmoid colon / Top expressed in: jejunum; left colon; duodenum; Paneth cell; skin of external ear; right kidney; renal corpuscle; proximal tubule; ileum; granulocyte; More reference expression data
BioGPS	More reference expression data
Gene ontology
Molecular function	cytokine receptor activity; protein binding; interleukin-13 receptor activity; cytokine binding
Cellular component	integral component of membrane; interleukin-13 receptor complex; plasma membrane; membrane; external side of plasma membrane; receptor complex
Biological process	cell surface receptor signaling pathway; cytokine-mediated signaling pathway; interleukin-13-mediated signaling pathway
Sources:Amigo / QuickGO
Orthologs
Databases	NCBI: entry; OMA: entry
Species	Human	Mouse
Entrez	3597	16164
Ensembl	ENSG00000131724	ENSMUSG00000017057
UniProt	P78552	O09030
RefSeq (mRNA)	NM_001560	NM_133990
RefSeq (protein)	NP_001551	NP_598751
Location (UCSC)	Chr X: 118.73 – 118.79 Mb	Chr X: 35.38 – 35.43 Mb
PubMed search
- Wikidata
View/Edit Human	View/Edit Mouse

Interleukin 13 receptor, alpha 1, also known as IL13RA1 and CD213A1 (cluster of differentiation 213A1), is a human gene.

The protein encoded by this gene is a subunit of the interleukin 13 receptor. This subunit forms a receptor complex with IL4 receptor alpha, a subunit shared by IL13 and IL4 receptors. This subunit serves as a primary IL13-binding subunit of the IL13 receptor, and may also be a component of IL4 receptors. This protein has been shown to bind tyrosine kinase TYK2, and thus may mediate the signaling processes that lead to the activation of JAK1, STAT3 and STAT6 induced by IL13 and IL4.

IL13RA1 expression has been linked to higher survival rates for lung cancer patients.

== See also ==
- Interleukin-13 receptor
