= Interleukin-4 receptor =

Protein-coding gene in the species Homo sapiens

IL4R

Identifiers
- Aliases: IL4R, CD124, IL-4RA, IL4RA, Interleukin-4 receptor, interleukin 4 receptor
- External IDs: OMIM: 147781; MGI: 105367; GeneCards: IL4R
Available structures
PDB	Ortholog search: PDBe RCSB
PDB	List of PDB id codes 1IAR, 1IRS, 3BPL, 3BPN, 3BPO, 5E4E

Gene location (Human)
Chr.	Chromosome 16 (human)
Band	16p12.1	Start	27,313,668 bp
Band	16p12.1	End	27,364,778 bp

Gene location (Mouse)
Chr.	Chromosome 7 (mouse)
Band	7 F3|7 68.94 cM	Start	125,151,292 bp
Band	7 F3|7 68.94 cM	End	125,178,646 bp
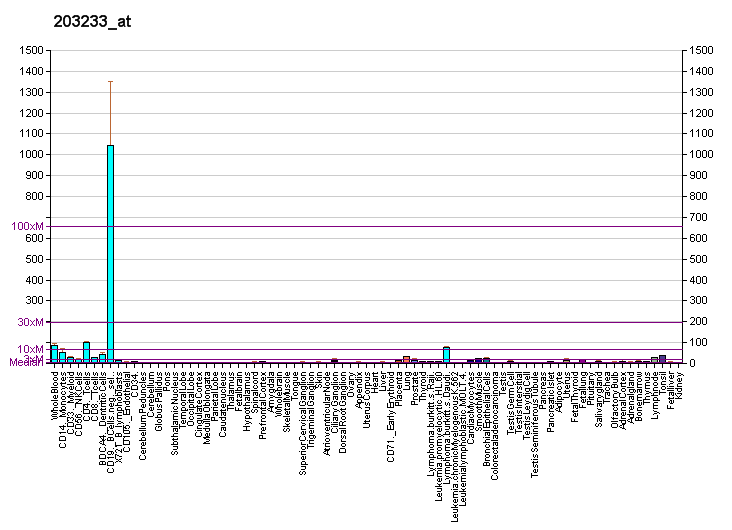
RNA expression pattern
Bgee	Human / Mouse (ortholog); Top expressed in: granulocyte; right lung; gastric mucosa; upper lobe of left lung; muscle layer of sigmoid colon; appendix; spleen; transverse colon; right lobe of liver; lymph node / Top expressed in: lumbar spinal ganglion; stroma of bone marrow; granulocyte; mesenteric lymph nodes; thymus; ankle joint; uterus; right lung lobe; spleen; ileum; More reference expression data
BioGPS	More reference expression data
Gene ontology
Molecular function	protein binding; cytokine receptor activity; interleukin-4 receptor activity
Cellular component	integral component of membrane; membrane; receptor complex; integral component of plasma membrane; extracellular region; extracellular space; plasma membrane
Biological process	immune system process; positive regulation of immunoglobulin production; positive regulation of macrophage activation; positive regulation of mast cell degranulation; response to estrogen; production of molecular mediator involved in inflammatory response; positive regulation of myoblast fusion; negative regulation of T-helper 1 cell differentiation; regulation of cell population proliferation; immunoglobulin mediated immune response; immune response; positive regulation of T-helper 2 cell differentiation; ovulation; signal transduction; defense response to protozoan; interleukin-4-mediated signaling pathway; response to odorant; cytokine-mediated signaling pathway; positive regulation of cold-induced thermogenesis
Sources:Amigo / QuickGO
Orthologs
Databases	NCBI: entry; OMA: entry
Species	Human	Mouse
Entrez	3566	16190
Ensembl	ENSG00000077238	ENSMUSG00000030748
UniProt	P24394	P16382
RefSeq (mRNA)	NM_000418; NM_001008699; NM_001257406; NM_001257407; NM_001257997	NM_001008700; NM_001363983
RefSeq (protein)	NP_000409; NP_001244335; NP_001244336; NP_001244926	NP_001008700; NP_001350912
Location (UCSC)	Chr 16: 27.31 – 27.36 Mb	Chr 7: 125.15 – 125.18 Mb
PubMed search
- Wikidata
View/Edit Human	View/Edit Mouse

Interleukin-4 receptor alpha chain, N-terminal
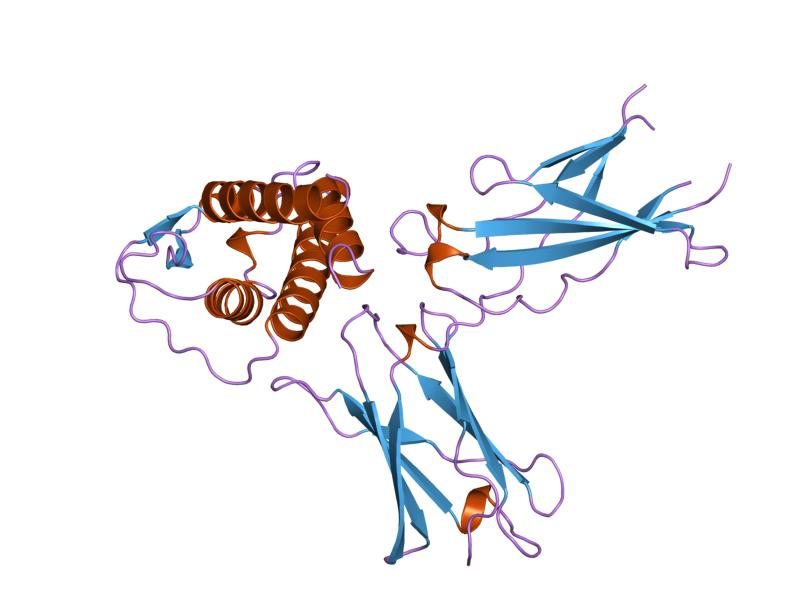
- interleukin-4 / receptor alpha chain complex

Identifiers
- Symbol: IL4Ra_N
- Pfam: PF09238
- InterPro: IPR015319
- SCOP2: 1iar / SCOPe / SUPFAM
Available protein structures:
- PDB: IPR015319 PF09238 (ECOD; PDBsum)
- AlphaFold: IPR015319; PF09238

The interleukin 4 receptor is a type I cytokine receptor. It is a heterodimer, that is, composed of two subunits. IL4R is the human gene coding for IL-4Rα, the subunit which combines with either common gamma chain (γc, forming the type I IL4 receptor) or with IL-13Rα1 (forming the type II IL4 receptor).

== Function ==
This gene encodes the alpha chain of the interleukin-4 receptor, a type I transmembrane protein that can bind interleukin 4 and interleukin 13 to regulate IgE antibody production in B cells. Among T cells, the encoded protein also can bind interleukin 4 to promote differentiation of Th2 cells. A soluble form of the encoded protein can be produced by an alternate splice variant or by proteolysis of the membrane-bound protein, and this soluble form can inhibit IL4-mediated cell proliferation and IL5 upregulation by T-cells. Allelic variations in this gene have been associated with atopy, a condition that can manifest itself as allergic rhinitis, sinusitis, asthma, or eczema. Two transcript variants encoding different isoforms, a membrane-bound and a soluble form, have been found for this gene. Interactions of IL-4 with TNFα promote structural changes to vascular endothelial cells, thus playing an important role in tissue inflammation.

The binding of IL-4 or IL-13 to the IL-4 receptor on the surface of macrophages results in the alternative activation of those macrophages. Alternatively activated macrophages (AAMΦ) downregulate inflammatory mediators such as IFNγ during immune responses, particularly with regards to helminth infections.

== Interactions ==
Interleukin-4 receptor has been shown to interact with SHC1.

== Structure ==
The N-terminal (extracellular) portion of interleukin-4 receptor is related in overall topology to fibronectin type III modules and folds into a sandwich comprising seven antiparallel beta sheets arranged in a three-strand and a four-strand beta-pleated sheet. They are required for binding of interleukin-4 to the receptor alpha chain, which is a crucial event for the generation of a Th2-dominated early immune response.

== See also ==
- Macrophage-activating factor
- Macrophage polarization
- Cluster of differentiation
- Fibronectin type III domain
