= Interleukin 4 =

Mammalian protein found in Mus musculus

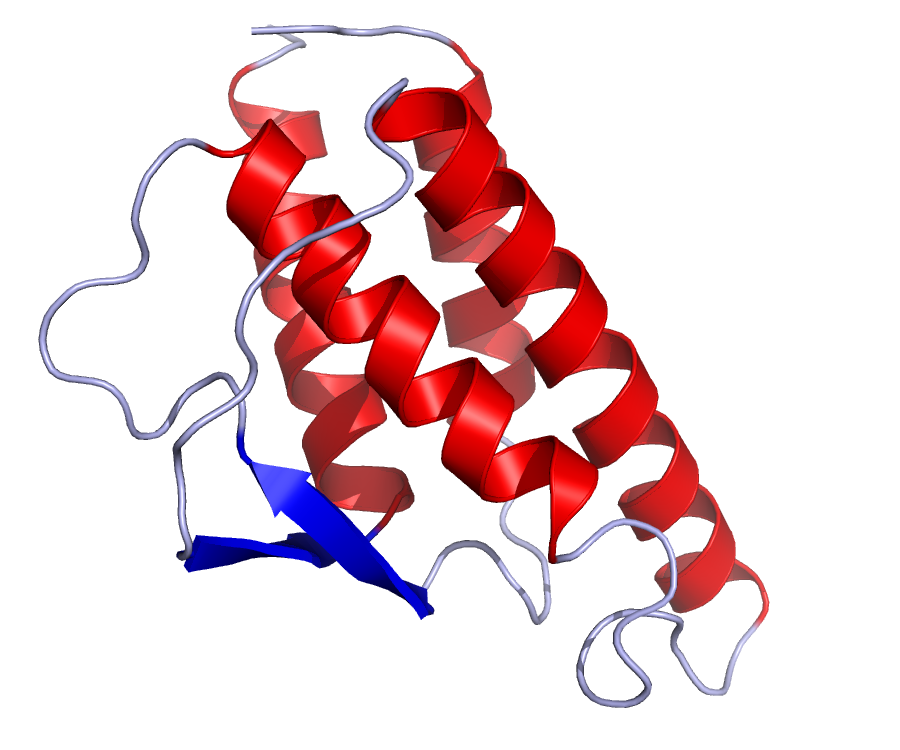

Identifiers
- Aliases: IL4, Interleukin 4, IGG1 induction factor, B-cell IgG differentiation factor, B-cell stimulatory factor 1, B-cell growth factor 1, Il4, lymphocyte stimulatory factor 1
- External IDs: MGI: 96556; GeneCards: IL4
Available structures
PDB	Ortholog search: PDBe RCSB
PDB	List of PDB id codes 1BBN, 1BCN, 1CYL, 1HIJ, 1HIK, 1HZI, 1IAR, 1ITI, 1ITL, 1ITM, 1RCB, 2B8U, 2B8X, 2B8Y, 2B8Z, 2B90, 2B91, 2CYK, 2D48, 2INT, 3BPL, 3BPN, 3QB7, 4YDY, 5FHX

Gene location (Human)
Chr.	Chromosome 5 (human)
Band	5q31.1	Start	132,009,678 bp
Band	5q31.1	End	132,018,370 bp

Gene location (Mouse)
Chr.	Chromosome 11 (mouse)
Band	11 B1.3|11 31.97 cM	Start	53,493,809 bp
Band	11 B1.3|11 31.97 cM	End	53,509,496 bp
RNA expression pattern
Bgee	Human / Mouse (ortholog); Top expressed in: oocyte; secondary oocyte; testicle; gonad; right uterine tube; monocyte; anterior pituitary; right coronary artery; olfactory zone of nasal mucosa; bone marrow cell / Top expressed in: neural layer of retina; superior frontal gyrus; spermatocyte; primary visual cortex; lens; embryo; embryo; dentate gyrus of hippocampal formation granule cell; ventricular zone; morula; More reference expression data
BioGPS	n/a
Gene ontology
Molecular function	interleukin-4 receptor binding; protein binding; growth factor activity; cytokine receptor binding; cytokine activity
Cellular component	extracellular region; extracellular space
Biological process	positive regulation of T cell differentiation; dendritic cell differentiation; negative regulation of endothelial cell apoptotic process; negative regulation of complement-dependent cytotoxicity; regulation of phosphorylation; negative regulation of apoptotic process; myeloid dendritic cell differentiation; type 2 immune response; B cell activation; positive regulation of interleukin-13 production; immune response; B cell differentiation; T-helper 2 cell cytokine production; regulation of isotype switching; negative regulation of transcription, DNA-templated; negative regulation of epithelial cell migration; regulation of signaling receptor activity; cholesterol metabolic process; positive regulation of B cell proliferation; positive regulation of T cell proliferation; T cell activation; positive regulation of MHC class II biosynthetic process; negative regulation of osteoclast differentiation; positive regulation of transcription, DNA-templated; positive regulation of transcription by RNA polymerase II; positive regulation of isotype switching to IgE isotypes; positive regulation of isotype switching to IgG isotypes; regulation of immune response; cytokine-mediated signaling pathway; positive regulation of gene expression; positive regulation of macroautophagy; positive regulation of tyrosine phosphorylation of STAT protein; activation of Janus kinase activity; positive regulation of receptor-mediated endocytosis; positive regulation of cold-induced thermogenesis; negative regulation of neuroinflammatory response; positive regulation of amyloid-beta clearance; neuroinflammatory response; positive regulation of cellular respiration; positive regulation of ATP biosynthetic process
Sources:Amigo / QuickGO
Orthologs
Databases	NCBI: entry; OMA: entry
Species	Human	Mouse
Entrez	3565	16189
Ensembl	ENSG00000113520	ENSMUSG00000000869
UniProt	P05112	P07750
RefSeq (mRNA)	NM_000589.4	NM_021283
RefSeq (protein)	NP_000580; NP_758858; NP_001341919	NP_067258
Location (UCSC)	Chr 5: 132.01 – 132.02 Mb	Chr 11: 53.49 – 53.51 Mb
PubMed search
- Wikidata
View/Edit Human	View/Edit Mouse

Interleukin 4
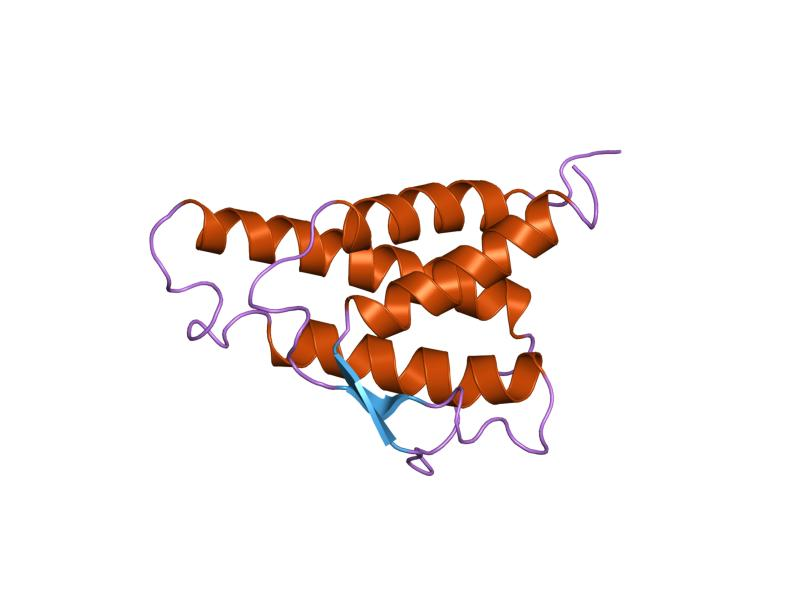
- analysis of the solution structure of human interleukin 4 determined by heteronuclear three-dimensional nuclear magnetic resonance techniques

Identifiers
- Symbol: IL4
- Pfam: PF00727
- Pfam clan: CL0053
- InterPro: IPR002354
- PROSITE: PDOC00655
- SCOP2: 2int / SCOPe / SUPFAM
Available protein structures:
- PDB: IPR002354 PF00727 (ECOD; PDBsum)
- AlphaFold: IPR002354; PF00727

The interleukin 4 (IL4, IL-4) is a cytokine that induces differentiation of naive helper T cells (T_{h}0 cells) to T_{h}2 cells. Upon activation by IL-4, T_{h}2 cells subsequently produce additional IL-4 in a positive feedback loop. IL-4 is produced primarily by mast cells, T_{h}2 cells, eosinophils and basophils. It is closely related and has functions similar to IL-13.

== Function ==
Interleukin 4 has many biological roles, including the stimulation of activated B cell and T cell proliferation, and the differentiation of B cells into plasma cells. It is a key regulator in humoral and adaptive immunity. IL-4 induces B cell class switching to IgE, and up-regulates MHC class II production. IL-4 decreases the production of T_{h}1 cells, macrophages, IFNγ, and dendritic cells IL-12.

Overproduction of IL-4 is associated with allergies.

=== Inflammation and wound repair ===
Tissue macrophages play an important role in chronic inflammation and wound repair. The presence of IL-4 in extravascular tissues promotes alternative activation of macrophages into M2 cells and inhibits classical activation of macrophages into M1 cells. An increase in repair macrophages (M2) is coupled with secretion of IL-10 and TGF-β that result in a diminution of pathological inflammation. Release of arginase, proline, polyaminases and TGF-β by the activated M2 cell is tied with wound repair and fibrosis.

== Receptor ==
The receptor for interleukin-4 is known as the IL-4Rα. This receptor exists in 3 different complexes throughout the body. Type 1 receptors are composed of the IL-4Rα subunit with a common γ chain and specifically bind IL-4. Type 2 receptors consist of an IL-4Rα subunit bound to a different subunit known as IL-13Rα1. These type 2 receptors have the ability to bind both IL-4 and IL-13, two cytokines with closely related biological functions.

== Structure ==
IL-4 has a compact, globular fold (similar to other cytokines), stabilised by 3 disulphide bonds. One half of the structure is dominated by a 4 alpha-helix bundle with a left-handed twist. The helices are anti-parallel, with 2 overhand connections, which fall into a 2-stranded anti-parallel beta-sheet.

== Evolution ==
IL-4 is closely related to IL-13, and both stimulate type 2 immunity. Genes of this family have also been found in fish, both in bony fish and cartilaginous fish; because at that evolutionary level they can't be distinguished as IL-4 or IL-13, they have been named IL-4/13.

== Discovery ==
This cytokine was co-discovered by Maureen Howard and William E. Paul as well as by Ellen Vitetta and her research group in 1982.

The nucleotide sequence for human IL-4 was isolated four years later confirming its similarity to a mouse protein called B cell stimulatory factor-1 (BCSF-1).

== Animal studies ==
IL-4 has been found to mediate a crosstalk between the neural stem cells and neurons that undergo neurodegeneration, and initiate a regeneration cascade through phosphorylation of its intracellular effector STAT6 in an experimental Alzheimer's disease model in adult zebrafish brain.

== Clinical significance ==
IL-4 plays an important role in the development of certain immune disorders, particularly allergies and some autoimmune diseases.

=== Allergic diseases ===
IL-4, along with other Th2 cytokines, is involved in the airway inflammation observed in the lungs of patients with allergic asthma.

Allergic diseases are sets of disorders that are manifested by a disproportionate response of the immune system to the allergen and T_{h}2 responses. These pathologies include, for example, atopic dermatitis, asthma, or systemic anaphylaxis. Interleukin 4 mediates important pro-inflammatory functions in asthma, including induction of isotype rearrangement of IgE, expression of vascular cell adhesion molecule 1 (VCAM-1), promoting eosinophilic transmigration through endothelium, mucus secretion and T helper type 2 (T_{h}2) leading to cytokine release. Asthma is a complex genetic disorder that has been associated with IL-4 gene promoter polymorphism and proteins involved in IL-4 signaling.

=== Tumors ===
IL-4 has been shown to drive mitogenesis, dedifferentiation, and metastasis in rhabdomyosarcoma. IL-4 has a significant effect on tumor progression. Increased IL-4 production was found in breast, prostate, lung, renal cells and other types of cancer. Overexpression of IL-4R has been found in many types of cancer. Renal cells and glioblastoma modify 10000–13000 receptors per cell depending on tumor type.

IL-4 can primitively motivate tumor cells and increase their apoptosis resistance by increasing tumor growth.

=== Nervous system ===
Brain tissue tumors such as astrocytoma, glioblastoma, meningioma, and medulloblastoma overexpress receptors for various growth factors including epidermal growth factor receptor, FGFR-1 (fibroblast growth factor receptor 1), TfR (transferrin receptor), IL-13R. Most human meningiomas massively expresses IL-4 receptors, indicating its role in cancer progression. They express IL-4Rα and IL13Rα-1-1, but not the surface γc chain, suggesting that most human meningiomas express IL-4 type II.

=== HIV ===
IL-4 may also play a role in the infection and development of HIV disease. Auxiliary T cells are a key element of HIV-1 infection. Several signs of immune dysregulation such as polyclonal B cell initialization, previous cell-mediated antigen-induced response and hypergammaglobulinaemia occur in most HIV-1 infected patients and are associated with cytokines synthesized by T_{h}2 cells. Increased IL-4 production by T_{h}2 cells has been demonstrated in people infected with HIV.

== See also ==
- STAT6
- IL-4-inhibitor-1
