= Interleukin 13 =

Protein and coding gene in humans

IL13
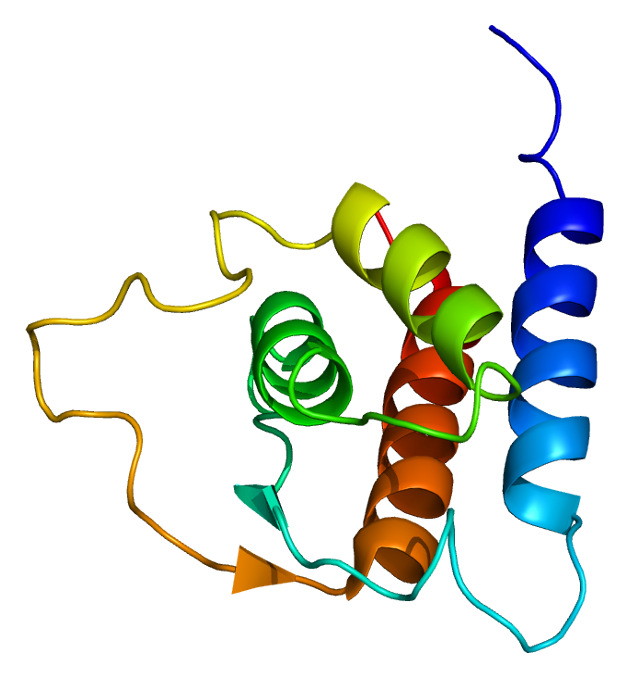

Identifiers
- Aliases: IL13, IL-13, P600, interleukin 13, Interleukin 13
- External IDs: OMIM: 147683; MGI: 96541; GeneCards: IL13
Available structures
PDB	Ortholog search: PDBe RCSB
PDB	List of PDB id codes 1GA3, 1IJZ, 1IK0, 3BPO, 3G6D, 3L5W, 3L5X, 3LB6, 4I77, 4PS4, 5E4E

Gene location (Mouse)
Chr.	Chromosome 11 (mouse)
Band	11 B1.3|11 31.98 cM	Start	53,522,151 bp
Band	11 B1.3|11 31.98 cM	End	53,525,529 bp
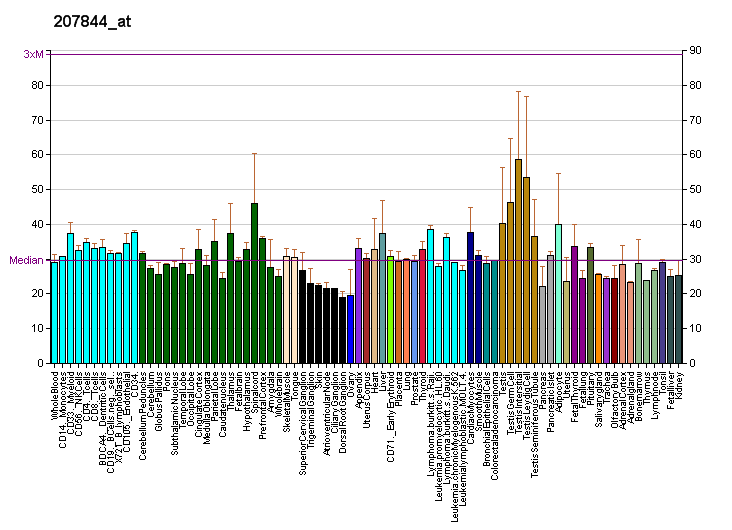
RNA expression pattern
Bgee	Human / Mouse (ortholog); n/a / Top expressed in: embryo; secondary oocyte; zygote; seminiferous tubule; thymus; spermatocyte; hippocampal formation; hippocampus proper; lip; spermatid
BioGPS	More reference expression data
Gene ontology
Molecular function	protein binding; cytokine receptor binding; cytokine activity; interleukin-13 receptor binding
Cellular component	cytoplasm; external side of plasma membrane; extracellular region; extracellular space
Biological process	negative regulation of endothelial cell apoptotic process; negative regulation of complement-dependent cytotoxicity; negative regulation of transforming growth factor beta production; positive regulation of lung goblet cell differentiation; response to mechanical stimulus; response to nicotine; positive regulation of release of sequestered calcium ion into cytosol; microglial cell activation; negative regulation of NAD(P)H oxidase activity; cellular response to mechanical stimulus; response to lipopolysaccharide; negative regulation of lung ciliated cell differentiation; positive regulation of ion transport; immune response; positive regulation of protein secretion; positive regulation of connective tissue growth factor production; positive regulation of pancreatic stellate cell proliferation; response to ethanol; inflammatory response; regulation of proton transport; positive regulation of smooth muscle cell proliferation; negative regulation of neuron death; positive regulation of immunoglobulin production; positive regulation of B cell proliferation; positive regulation of macrophage activation; positive regulation of mast cell degranulation; cellular response to cytokine stimulus; positive regulation of tyrosine phosphorylation of STAT protein; regulation of signaling receptor activity; cytokine-mediated signaling pathway; positive regulation of gene expression; positive regulation of cold-induced thermogenesis
Sources:Amigo / QuickGO
Orthologs
Databases	NCBI: entry; OMA: entry
Species	Human	Mouse
Entrez	3596	16163
Ensembl	ENSG00000169194	ENSMUSG00000020383
UniProt	P35225	P20109
RefSeq (mRNA)	NM_002188	NM_008355
RefSeq (protein)	NP_002179; NP_001341920; NP_001341921; NP_001341922	NP_032381
Location (UCSC)	n/a	Chr 11: 53.52 – 53.53 Mb
PubMed search
- Wikidata
View/Edit Human	View/Edit Mouse

Interleukin 13 (IL-13) and its relative interleukin-4 are signalling proteins of the adaptive immune systems of vertebrates. They are immunoregulatory cytokines belonging to the type 2 cytokine family, primarily produced by activated T helper 2 (Th2) cells, as well as innate lymphoid cells type 2 (ILC2s), natural killer T cell, mast cells, basophils, eosinophils and nuocytes during type 2 immune responses. Type 2 immune responses are essential for defense against large extracellular parasites like helminths, by promoting B-cell maturation, immunoglobulin E (IgE) class switching, eosinophil recruitment, mucus production, and alternative (M2) macrophage polarization that suppresses excessive inflammation and supports tissue repair. Interleukin-13 is a central regulator in IgE synthesis, goblet cell hyperplasia, mucus hypersecretion, airway hyperresponsiveness, fibrosis and chitinase up-regulation. It is a mediator of allergic inflammation and different diseases including asthma, and atopic dermatitis.

== Structure ==
The human IL-13is encoded by the IL13 gene. IL-13 was first cloned in 1993 and is located on chromosome 5q31.1 with a length of 1.4kb. It has a mass of 13 kDa and folds into 4 alpha helical bundles. The secondary structural features of IL-13 are similar to that of Interleukin 4 (IL-4); however it only has 25% sequence identity to IL-4 and is capable of IL-4 independent signaling.

== Functions ==
IL-13 has effects on immune cells that are similar to those of the closely related cytokine IL-4. However, IL-13 is suspected to be the central mediator of the physiologic changes induced by allergic inflammation in many tissues.

Although IL-13 is associated primarily with the induction of airway disease, it also has anti-inflammatory properties. IL-13 induces a class of protein-degrading enzymes, known as matrix metalloproteinases (MMPs), in the airways. These enzymes are required to induce ingression of parenchymal inflammatory cells into the airway lumen, where they are then cleared. Among other factors, IL-13 induces these MMPs as part of a mechanism that protects against excessive allergic inflammation that predisposes to asphyxiation.

IL-13 is known to induce changes in hematopoietic cells, but these effects are probably less important than that of IL-4. Furthermore, IL-13 can induce immunoglobulin E (IgE) secretion from activated human B cells. Deletion of IL-13 from mice does not markedly affect either Th2 cell development or antigen-specific IgE responses induced by potent allergens. In comparison, deletion of IL-4 deactivates these responses. Thus, rather than a lymphoid cytokine, IL-13 acts more prominently as a molecular bridge linking allergic inflammatory cell to the non-immune cells in contact with them, thereby altering physiological function.

The signaling of IL-13 begins through a shared multi-subunit receptor with IL-4. This receptor is a heterodimer receptor complex consisting of alpha IL-4 receptor (IL-4Rα) and alpha Interleukin-13 receptor (IL-13R1). The high affinity of IL-13 to the IL-13R1 leads to their bond formation which further increase the probability of a heterodimer formation to IL-4R1 and the production of the type 2 IL-4 receptor. Heterodimerization activates both the STAT6 and the IRS. STAT6 signaling is important in initiation of the allergic response. Most of the biological effects of IL-13, like those of IL-4, are linked to a single transcription factor, signal transducer and activator of transcription 6 (STAT6). Interleukin-13 and its associated receptors with α subunit of the IL-4 receptor (IL-4Rα) allows for the downstream activation of STAT6. The JAK Janus kinase proteins on the cytoplasmic end of the receptors allows for the phosphorylation of STAT6, which then forms an activated homodimer and are transported to the nucleus. Once in the nucleus, STAT6 heterodimer molecule regulates gene expression of cell types critical to the balance between host immune defense and allergic inflammatory responses such as the development of Th2. This can be resulted from an allergic reaction brought about when facing an Ala gene. IL-13 also binds to another receptor known as IL-13Rα2. IL-13Rα2 (which is labelled as a decoy receptor) is derived from Th2 cells and is a pleiotropic immune regulatory cytokine. IL-13 has greater affinity (50-times) to IL-13Rα2 than to IL-13Ra1. The IL-13Rα2 subunit binds only to IL-13 and it exists in both membrane-bound and soluble forms in mice. A soluble form of IL-13Rα2 has not been detected in human subjects. Studies of IL-13 transgenic mice lungs with IL-13Rα2 null loci indicated that IL-13Rα2 deficiency significantly augmented IL-13 or ovalbumin-induced pulmonary inflammation and remodeling. Most normal cells, such as immune cells or endothelial cells, express very low or undetectable levels of IL-13 receptors. Research has shown that cell-surface expression of IL-13Rα2 on human asthmatic airway fibroblasts was reduced compared with expression on normal control airway fibroblasts. This supported the hypothesis that IL-13Rα2 is a negative regulator of IL-13–induced response and illustrated significantly reduced production of TGF-β1 and deposition of collagen in the lungs of mice.

Interleukin-13 has a critical role in goblet cell metaplasia. Goblet cells are filled with mucin (MUC). MUC5AC Mucin 5AC is a gel-like mucin product of goblet cells. Interleukin-13 induces goblet cell differentiation and allows for the production of MUC5AC in tracheal epithelium. 15-Lipoxygenase-1 (15LO1) which is an enzyme in the fatty acid metabolism and its metabolite, 15-HETE, are highly expressed in asthma (which lead to the overexpression of MUC5AC) and are induced by IL-13 in human airway epithelial cells. With the increasing number of goblet cells, there is the production of excessive mucus within the bronchi. The functional consequences of the changes in MUC storation and secretion contributes to the pathophysiologic mechanisms for various clinical abnormalities in asthmatic patients including sputum production, airway narrowing, exacerbation and accelerated loss in lung function.

Additionally, IL-13 has been shown to induce a potent fibrogenic program during the course of diverse diseases marked by elevated Type 2 cytokines such as chronic schistosomiasis and atopic dermatitis among others. It has been suggested that this fibrogenic program is critically dependent on direct IL-13 signaling through IL-4Rα on PDGFRβ+ fibroblasts.

== Evolution ==
IL-13 is closely related to IL-4, and both stimulate Type 2 immunity. Genes of this family have also been found in fish, both in bony fish and cartilaginous fish; because at that evolutionary level they can't be distinguished as IL-4 or IL-13, they have been named IL-4/13.

== Clinical significance ==
IL-13 specifically induces physiological changes in parasitized organs that are required to expel the offending organisms or their products. For example, expulsion from the gut of a variety of mouse helminths requires IL-13 secreted by Th2 cells. IL-13 induces several changes in the gut that create an environment hostile to the parasite, including enhanced contractions and glycoprotein hyper-secretion from gut epithelial cells, that ultimately lead to detachment of the organism from the gut wall and their removal.

The eggs of the parasite Schistosoma mansoni may lodge in a variety of organs including the gut wall, liver, lung and even central nervous system, inducing the formation of granulomas under the control of IL-13. Here, however, the eventual result is organ damage and often profound or even fatal disease, not resolution of the infection. An emerging concept is that IL-13 may antagonize Th1 responses that are required to resolve intracellular infections. In this immune dysregulated context, marked by the recruitment of aberrantly large numbers of Th2 cells, IL-13 inhibits the ability of host immune cells to destroy intracellular pathogens.

IL-13 expression has demonstrated to be increased in bronchoalveolar lavage (BAL) fluid and cells in patients with atopic mild asthma after allergen challenge. Genome-wide association studies have identified multiple polymorphisms of IL-13 and genes encoding the IL-13 receptors as associated with asthma susceptibility, bronchial hyperresponsiveness, and increased IgE levels. The overexpression of IL-13 induces many features of allergic lung disease, including airway hyperresponsiveness, goblet cell metaplasia, mucus hypersecretion and airway remodelling which all contribute to airway obstruction. murine studies demonstrated that IL-13 was both necessary and sufficient to generate asthma-like Th2 responses in the mouse lung. IL-13 is mainly overexpressed in sputum, bronchial submucosa, peripheral blood and mast cells in the airway smooth muscle bundle. IL-4 contributes to these physiologic changes, but is less important than IL-13. IL-13 also induces secretion of chemokines that are required for recruitment of allergic effector cells to the lung. Studies of STAT6 transgenic mice suggest the possibility that IL-13 signaling occurring only through the airway epithelium is required for most of these effects. While no studies have yet directly implicated IL-13 in the control of human diseases, many polymorphisms in the IL-13 gene have been shown to confer an enhanced risk of atopic respiratory diseases such as asthma. In a study conducted with knockout mice model for asthma, air resistance, mucus production and profibrogenic mediator induction were solely found to be dependent on the presence of IL-13R1 and not IL-13Rα2. Studies on transgenic mouse in vivo demonstrate that lung over-expression of IL-13 induces subepithelial airway fibrosis. IL-13 is the dominant effector in toxin, infection, allergic, and post-transplant bronchiolitis obliterans models of fibrosis.

Other research suggests that IL-13 is responsible for the promotion of the survival and the migration of epithelial cells, production of inducible nitric oxide synthase by airway epithelial cells, activation of macrophages, permeability of the epithelial cells, and transformation of airway fibroblasts to myofibroblasts leading to collagen deposition. The deposition then influences the airway remodelling in asthmatic patients.

Besides its well-established role in respiratory diseases IL-13 also plays a role in anti-inflammatory processes of other organs. It suppresses proinflammatory mediators and it is involved in wound repair after injury. In type I diabetes, IL-13 antagonized cytotoxic insults to pancreatic β cells enhanced by IL-6. In a mouse model of acetaminophen-induced liver injury eosinophil-driven IL-4/IL-13 mediated hepatoprotective function. In severe alcohol-associated hepatitis low plasma level of IL-13 is a predictor of short-term (90-day) mortality. However, in contrast to its short-term beneficiary effects in acute situations, chronically increased IL-13 contributes to development of fibrosis and cirrhosis.

Dupilumab is a monoclonal antibody IL-13 and IL-4 modulator that targets the shared receptor of IL-4 and IL-13, IL4Rα. Since IL-4 and IL-13 have similar biological activities, dupilumab may be an effective form of treatment for asthmatic patients. Cendakimab is also a monoclonal antibody to the IL-13 receptor.

== See also ==
- Interleukin-13 receptor, the IL-13 receptor
