= Interleukin 31 =

Protein in the species Homo sapiens

IL31

Identifiers
- Aliases: IL31, IL-31, interleukin 31
- External IDs: OMIM: 609509; MGI: 1923649; GeneCards: IL31

Gene location (Human)
Chr.	Chromosome 12 (human)
Band	12q24.31	Start	122,172,029 bp
Band	12q24.31	End	122,174,221 bp

Gene location (Mouse)
Chr.	Chromosome 5 (mouse)
Band	5|5 F	Start	123,618,220 bp
Band	5|5 F	End	123,627,552 bp
RNA expression pattern
Bgee	Human / Mouse (ortholog); Top expressed in: gastric mucosa; human musculoskeletal system; gastrocnemius muscle; islet of Langerhans / Top expressed in: spermatid; spermatocyte; seminiferous tubule; zygote; placenta; islet of Langerhans; nucleus of brain; telencephalic nucleus; hypothalamus; basal forebrain; More reference expression data
BioGPS	n/a
Gene ontology
Molecular function	cytokine activity; cytokine receptor binding
Cellular component	extracellular region; extracellular space
Biological process	immune system process; regulation of signaling receptor activity; cytokine-mediated signaling pathway
Sources:Amigo / QuickGO
Orthologs
Databases	NCBI: entry; OMA: entry
Species	Human	Mouse
Entrez	386653	76399
Ensembl	ENSG00000204671	ENSMUSG00000029437
UniProt	Q6EBC2	Q6EAL8
RefSeq (mRNA)	NM_001014336	NM_029594
RefSeq (protein)	NP_001014358	NP_083870
Location (UCSC)	Chr 12: 122.17 – 122.17 Mb	Chr 5: 123.62 – 123.63 Mb
PubMed search
- Wikidata
View/Edit Human	View/Edit Mouse

Interleukin-31 (IL-31) is a protein that in humans is encoded by the IL31 gene that resides on chromosome 12. IL-31 is an inflammatory cytokine that helps trigger cell-mediated immunity against pathogens. It has also been identified as a major player in a number of chronic inflammatory diseases, including atopic dermatitis.

IL-31 is produced by a variety of cells, namely type 2 helper (T_{H}2) T-cells. IL-31 sends signals through a receptor complex made of IL-31RA and oncostatin M receptor β (OSMRβ) expressed in immune and epithelial cells. These signals activate three pathways: ERK1/2 MAP kinase, PI3K/AKT, and JAK1/2 signaling pathways.

== Structure ==
IL-31 is a cytokine with an anti-parallel four-helix bundle structure in the gp130/IL-6 cytokine family. This family includes IL-6, IL-11, IL-27, leukemia inhibitory factor (LIF), oncostatin M (OSM), ciliary neurotrophic factor (CNTF), cardiotrophin-1 (CT-1), cardiotrophin-like cytokine (CLC), and neuropoietin (NP). The anti-parallel bundles that these proteins form have an "up-up-down-down" topology, which is a relevant structure regarding the cytokine binding to their respective receptor complex. The cytokines in the IL-6 family signal through type I cytokine receptors. Type I cytokine receptors are defined by sharing their cytokine binding domain (CBD) with conserved cysteine residues and a conserved WSxWS motif in the extracellular domain. The receptors form heteromeric complexes that usually contain the glycoprotein 130 (gp130), which is important for activating downstream signaling pathways. IL-31 is unique in this family of cytokines because its receptor complex does not contain gp130. The receptor for IL-31 is a heterodimer of the interleukin 31 receptor alpha (IL-31RA) and OSMR. IL-31RA was originally referred to as GLM-R (for gp130-like monocyte receptor) or GPL (for gp130-like receptor). Although the IL-31 receptor complex lacks gp130, IL-31RA has similarities to gp130 like its previous descriptors suggest.

== Signaling ==
IL-31 signals via a receptor complex that is composed of IL-31 receptor A (IL31RA) and oncostatin M receptor (OSMR) subunits. These receptor subunits are expressed in activated monocytes and in unstimulated epithelial cells. IL-31RA binds IL-31 through its cytokine binding domain (CBD). OSMR does not normally bind to IL-31 but it does increase the IL-31 binding affinity to IL-31RA. IL-31RA has an intracellular domain that possesses a box1 motif that mediates association with kinases of the JAK family. Additionally, the intracellular portion of the IL-31RA contains tyrosine residues. When IL-31 binds to the receptor complex, JAK kinases are activated which phosphorylate and activate STAT1, STAT3, and STAT5. The OSMR portion of the IL-31 binding complex contains intracellular motifs box1 and box2. This allows for JAK1 and JAK2 to bind, which are recruited once the tyrosine residues on the intracellular domain are phosphorylated. Through these phosphorylation sites, STAT3 and STAT5 are recruited and phosphorylated by JAK1 and JAK2. In addition to STATs, PI3K is recruited, which stimulates the PI3K/AKT signaling pathway. In contrast to IL-31RA, which binds SHP-2, the OSMR interacts with the adaptor protein Shc via the phosphorylated tyrosines on its intracellular domain. Through Shc, the RAS/RAF/MEK/ERK pathway is activated along with the p38 and JNK pathways. When IL-31 binds to the IL-31RA/OSMR complex, the JAK, PI3K/AKT, and ERK signaling pathways are activated. The pathways allow for target genes to be transcribed.

== Function ==
Interleukin 31 is an inflammatory cytokine produced by activated CD4^{+} T lymphocytes, in particular activated T_{H}2 helper cells, mast cells, macrophages, and dendritic cells. Its major sites of action are the skin, lung, intestine and the nervous system. Hence IL-31's main role is to facilitate cell-mediated immunity against pathogens.

IL-31 and its receptors are also involved in regulating hematopoietic progenitor cell homeostasis.

== Clinical significance ==
IL-31 is believed to play a role in chronic inflammation diseases. One of these diseases is atopic dermatitis, or eczema. Biopsy samples of patients with atopic dermatitis had elevated levels of IL-31 when compared to samples from patients without atopic dermatitis. IL-31 plays a role in this disease by inducing chemokine genes CCL1, CCL17, and CCL22. The chemokines transcribed from these genes recruit T-cells to the irritated skin where they secrete more IL-31. This cycle is the current understanding of IL-31's role in atopic dermatitis. Along with atopic dermatitis, IL-31 is believed to play a role in inflammatory bowel disease and airway hypersensitivity.

Pruritic forms of inflammatory skin diseases, or itchy skin diseases, have been found to have elevated levels of IL-31 mRNA in patient biopsies. Analysis of the tissue distribution of the IL-31 receptor complex found that IL-31RA is abundant in dorsal root ganglia of different human tissues. Dorsal root ganglia is where the cell bodies of primary sensory neurons reside. Dorsal root ganglia are also believed to be where the "itch" sensation originates. These findings support the elevated levels of IL-31 in skin biopsies of pruritic skin diseases.

A monoclonal antibody against IL-31 named lokivetmab is available for the treatment of canine atopic dermatitis.
