= Vixarelimab =

Monoclonal antibody
- Type: ?

Clinical data
- Other names: KPL-716; BIIB069; BIIB-069

Legal status
- Legal status: Investigational

Identifiers
- CAS Number: 2243320-83-2
- UNII: W25GO3A75W

Vixarelimab (KPL-716) is a fully human monoclonal antibody that works by binding to the oncostatin M receptor β, thus inhibiting both interleukin 31 and oncostatin M. It is developed by Kiniksa Pharmaceuticals for prurigo nodularis.
