= CLCF1 =

Protein-coding gene in humans

Identifiers
- Aliases: CLCF1, BSF-3, BSF3, CISS2, CLC, NNT-1, NNT1, NR6, cardiotrophin-like cytokine factor 1, cardiotrophin like cytokine factor 1
- External IDs: OMIM: 607672; MGI: 1930088; GeneCards: CLCF1

Gene location (Human)
Chr.	Chromosome 11 (human)
Band	11q13.2	Start	67,364,168 bp
Band	11q13.2	End	67,374,177 bp

Gene location (Mouse)
Chr.	Chromosome 19 (mouse)
Band	19|19 A	Start	4,264,292 bp
Band	19|19 A	End	4,273,544 bp
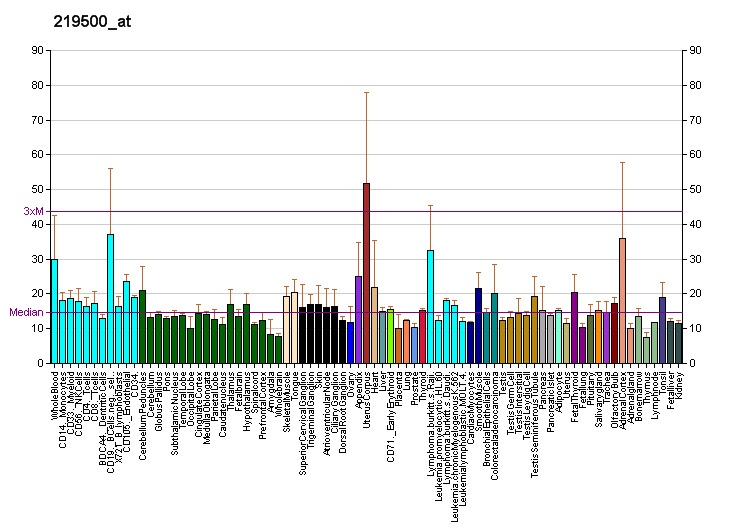
RNA expression pattern
Bgee	Human / Mouse (ortholog); Top expressed in: left uterine tube; testicle; body of uterus; gallbladder; cartilage tissue; gastric mucosa; granulocyte; canal of the cervix; right uterine tube; stromal cell of endometrium / Top expressed in: spleen; bone marrow; adrenal gland; islet of Langerhans; embryo; embryo; thymus; lip; urinary bladder; epiblast; More reference expression data
BioGPS	More reference expression data
Gene ontology
Molecular function	cytokine activity; protein binding; protein heterodimerization activity; ciliary neurotrophic factor receptor binding; growth factor activity; signaling receptor binding
Cellular component	CNTFR-CLCF1 complex; CRLF-CLCF1 complex; extracellular region; intracellular anatomical structure; extracellular space
Biological process	negative regulation of neuron apoptotic process; positive regulation of isotype switching to IgE isotypes; receptor signaling pathway via JAK-STAT; positive regulation of astrocyte differentiation; positive regulation of immunoglobulin production; cell surface receptor signaling pathway; positive regulation of B cell proliferation; positive regulation of cell population proliferation; B cell differentiation; positive regulation of tyrosine phosphorylation of STAT protein; regulation of signaling receptor activity; cytokine-mediated signaling pathway
Sources:Amigo / QuickGO
Orthologs
Databases	NCBI: entry; OMA: entry
Species	Human	Mouse
Entrez	23529	56708
Ensembl	ENSG00000175505	ENSMUSG00000040663
UniProt	Q9UBD9	Q9QZM3
RefSeq (mRNA)	NM_013246; NM_001166212	NM_019952; NM_001310038; NM_001310039
RefSeq (protein)	NP_001159684; NP_037378	NP_001296967; NP_001296968; NP_064336
Location (UCSC)	Chr 11: 67.36 – 67.37 Mb	Chr 19: 4.26 – 4.27 Mb
PubMed search
- Wikidata
View/Edit Human	View/Edit Mouse

Cardiotrophin-like cytokine factor 1 (CLCF1), also known as Novel Neurotrophin-1 (NNT-1) or B cell-stimulating factor-3 (BSF-3), is a protein that in humans is encoded by the CLCF1 gene.

== Function ==
CLCF1 is a cytokine. It induces tyrosine phosphorylation of the IL-6 receptor common subunit glycoprotein 130 (gp130), leukemia inhibitory factor receptor beta, and the transcription factor STAT3. It has been implicated in the induction of IL-1 (via induction of corticosterone and IL-6) and serum amyloid A, and in B cell hyperplasia. CLCF1 is capable of B cell activation via gp130 receptor stimulation.

== Structure ==
CLCF1 is a cytokine belonging to the interleukin-6 (IL6) family. It is a secreted protein, found predominantly in lymph nodes and spleen, and contains 225 amino acids with a molecular mass of 22 kDa in its mature form. IL6 family members share similarity in gene structure and have a 4-helix bundle in their protein structure. CLCF1 is closely related to other proteins called cardiotrophin-1 and ciliary neurotrophic factor.
