= Oncostatin M =

Mammalian protein found in Homo sapiens

OSM
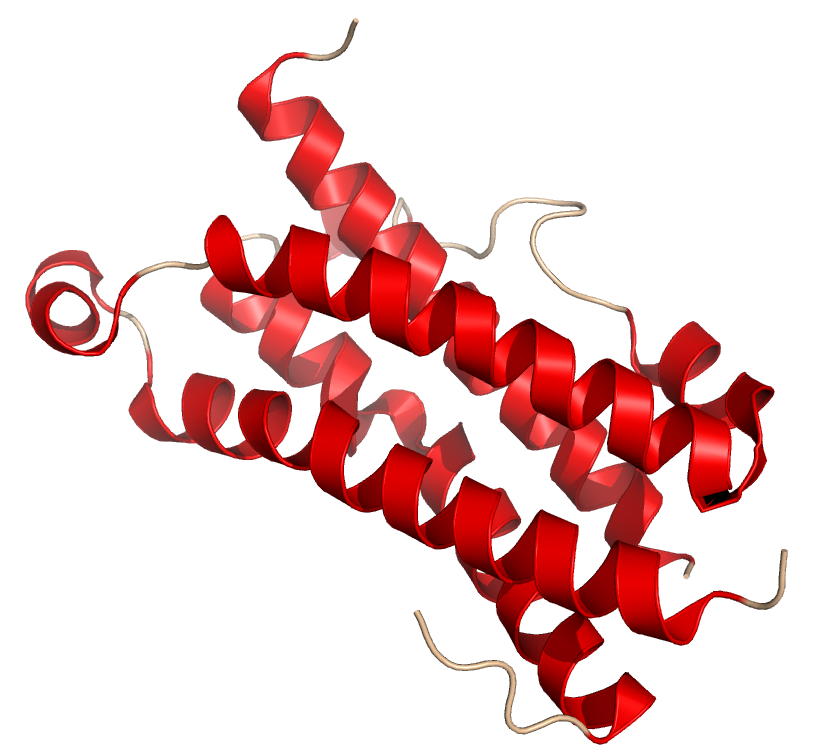

Identifiers
- Aliases: OSM, Osm, OncoM, oncostatin M
- External IDs: OMIM: 165095; MGI: 104749; GeneCards: OSM
Available structures
PDB	Ortholog search: PDBe RCSB
PDB	List of PDB id codes 1EVS

Gene location (Human)
Chr.	Chromosome 22 (human)
Band	22q12.2	Start	30,262,829 bp
Band	22q12.2	End	30,266,851 bp

Gene location (Mouse)
Chr.	Chromosome 11 (mouse)
Band	11 A1|11 2.94 cM	Start	4,186,420 bp
Band	11 A1|11 2.94 cM	End	4,191,026 bp
RNA expression pattern
Bgee	Human / Mouse (ortholog); Top expressed in: bone marrow cell; monocyte; blood; nasal epithelium; appendix; granulocyte; gallbladder; upper lobe of left lung; abdominal wall; spleen / Top expressed in: granulocyte; stroma of bone marrow; morula; blastocyst; submandibular gland; blood; mesenteric lymph nodes; thymus; spleen; gastrula; More reference expression data
BioGPS	n/a
Gene ontology
Molecular function	cytokine activity; oncostatin-M receptor binding; growth factor activity
Cellular component	extracellular region; extracellular space
Biological process	oncostatin-M-mediated signaling pathway; positive regulation of peptidyl-serine phosphorylation; multicellular organism development; immune response; positive regulation of cell population proliferation; positive regulation of acute inflammatory response; regulation of growth; cell population proliferation; negative regulation of hormone secretion; positive regulation of cell division; positive regulation of MAPK cascade; negative regulation of cell population proliferation; positive regulation of transcription by RNA polymerase II; positive regulation of tyrosine phosphorylation of STAT protein; regulation of signaling receptor activity; positive regulation of peptidyl-tyrosine phosphorylation; cytokine-mediated signaling pathway; positive regulation of phosphatidylinositol 3-kinase signaling; positive regulation of inflammatory response; positive regulation of protein kinase B signaling; regulation of hematopoietic stem cell differentiation
Sources:Amigo / QuickGO
Orthologs
Databases	NCBI: entry; OMA: entry
Species	Human	Mouse
Entrez	5008	18413
Ensembl	ENSG00000099985	ENSMUSG00000058755
UniProt	P13725	P53347
RefSeq (mRNA)	NM_020530; NM_001319108	NM_001013365
RefSeq (protein)	NP_001306037; NP_065391	NP_001013383
Location (UCSC)	Chr 22: 30.26 – 30.27 Mb	Chr 11: 4.19 – 4.19 Mb
PubMed search
- Wikidata
View/Edit Human	View/Edit Mouse

Oncostatin M, also known as OSM, is a protein that in humans is encoded by the OSM gene.

OSM is a pleiotropic cytokine that belongs to the interleukin 6 group of cytokines. Of these cytokines it most closely resembles leukemia inhibitory factor (LIF) in both structure and function. As yet poorly defined, it is proving important in liver development, haematopoeisis, inflammation and possibly CNS development. It is also associated with bone formation and destruction.

OSM signals through cell surface receptors that contain the protein gp130. The type I receptor is composed of gp130 and LIFR, the type II receptor is composed of gp130 and OSMR.

== Discovery, isolation and cloning ==
The human form of OSM was originally isolated in 1986 from the growth media of PMA treated U-937 histiocytic lymphoma cells by its ability to inhibit the growth of cell lines established from melanomas and other solid tumours. A robust protein, OSM is stable between pH2 and 11 and resistant to heating for one hour at 56 °C. A partial amino acid sequence allowed the isolation of human OSM cDNA and subsequently genomic clones. The full cDNA clone of hOSM encodes a 252 amino acid precursor, the first 25 amino acids of which functions as a secretory signal peptide, which on removal yields the soluble 227 amino acid pro-OSM. Cleavage of the C-terminal most 31 residues at a trypsin like cleavage site yields the fully active 196 residue form. Two potential N-glycosylation sites are present in hOSM both of which are retained in the mature form.

The 196 residue OSM is the predominant form isolated form a variety of cell lines and corresponds to a glycoprotein of 28 KDa, although the larger 227 residue pro-OSM can be isolated from over transfected cells. Pro-OSM, although an order of magnitude less efficacious in growth inhibition assays, displays similar binding affinity toward cells in radio ligand binding assays. Thus, post translational processing may play a significant role in the in vivo function of OSM. Like many cytokines OSM is produced from cells by de novo synthesis followed by release through the classical secretion pathway. However, OSM can be released from preformed stores within polymorphonuclear leukocytes on degranulation. It still remains unclear how OSM is targeted to these intracellular compartments.

== Structure ==
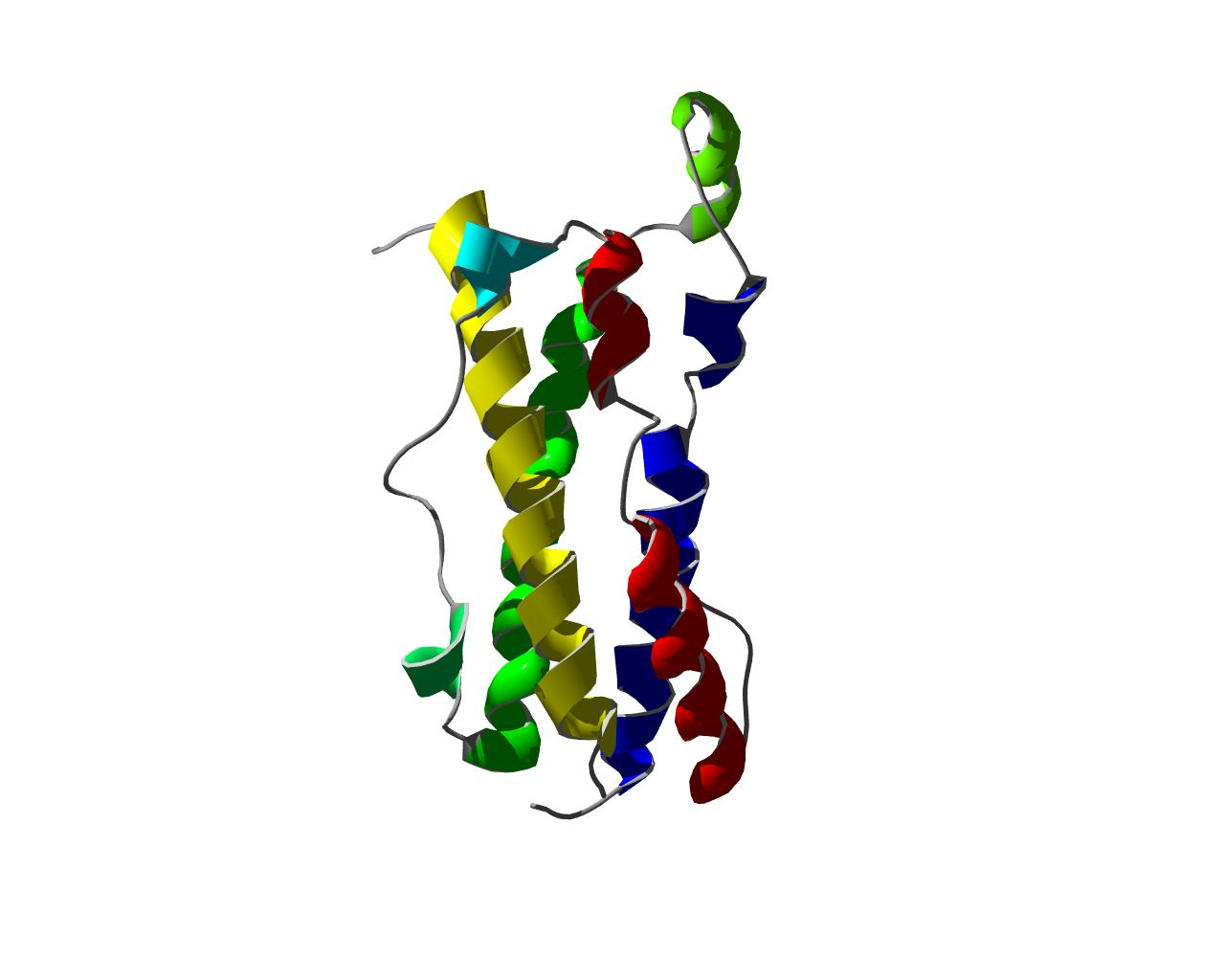
Ribbon representation of oncostatin M showing the 4 alpha helix bundle.

Primary sequence analysis of OSM allocates it to the gp130 group of cytokines. OSM most resembles LIF, bearing 22% sequence identity and 30% similarity. Incidentally the genes for OSM and LIF occur in tandem on human chromosome 22. Both LIF and OSM genes have very similar gene structures sharing similar promoter elements and intron-exon structure. These data suggest that OSM and LIF arose relatively recently in evolutionary terms by gene duplication. Of the five cysteine residues within the human OSM sequence four participate in disulfide bridges, one of these disulfide bonds namely between helices A and B is necessary for OSM activity. The free cysteine residue does not appear to mediate dimerisation of OSM.

The three-dimensional structure of human OSM has been solved to atomic resolution, confirming the predicted long chain four helix bundle topology. Comparing this structure with the known structures of other known LC cytokines shows it to be most closely related to LIF (RMSD of 2.1 Å across 145 equivalent Cα). A distinctive kink in the A helix arises from departure of the classical alpha helical H-bonding pattern, a feature shared with all known structures of LIFR using cytokines. This "kink" results in a different special positioning of one extreme of the bundle to the other, significantly affecting the relative positioning of site III with sites I and II (see:Receptor recruitment sites)

== Receptors ==
Receptors for OSM can be found on a variety of cells from a variety of tissues. In general cells derived from endothelial and tumour origins express high levels of OSM receptors, whereas cells of Haematopoietic origin tend to express lower numbers. Scatchard analysis of radio ligand binding data from 125I-OSM binding to a variety of OSM responsive cell lines produced curvilinear graphs which the authors interpreted as the presence of two receptor species, a high affinity form with an approximate dissociation constant Kd of 1-10 pM, and a low affinity form of 0.4-1 nM. Subsequently it was shown that the presence of gp130 alone was sufficient to reproduce the low affinity form of the receptor, and co-transfection of COS-7 cells with LIFR and gp130 produced a high affinity receptor. However further experiments demonstrated that not all actions of OSM could be replicated by LIF, that is certain cells that are irresponsive to LIF would respond to OSM. This data hinted to the existence of an additional ligand specific receptor chain which led to the cloning of OSMR. These two receptor complexes, namely gp130/LIFR and gp130/OSMR, were termed the type I and type II Oncostatin-M receptors. The ability of OSM to signal via two receptor complexes conveniently offers a molecular explanation to the shared and unique effects of OSM with respect to LIF. Thus common biological activities of LIF and OSM are mediated through the type I receptor and OSM specific activities are mediated through the type II receptor.

The murine homologue of OSM was not discovered until 1996, whereas the murine OSMR homologue was not cloned until 1998. Until recently, it was thought that mOSM only signals through the murine type II receptor, namely through mOSMR/mgp130 complexes, because of a low affinity for the type I receptor counterpart. However, it is now known that, in bone at least, mOSM is able to signal through both mOSMR/mgp130 and mLIFR/mgp130.

== Receptor recruitment sites ==
Oncostatin M triggers the formation of receptor complexes by binding to receptors via two binding sites named site II and site III. The nomenclature of these sites is taken by direct analogy to Growth Hormone, probably the best studied of four helix bundle cytokines.

Site II consists of exposed residues within the A and C helices, and confers binding to gp130. The crucial residues of site III are located at the N-terminal extremity of the D-helix. This site is the most conserved amongst IL-6 like cytokines. OSM contains a conserved Phenylalanine and Lysine residues (F160 and K163). Cytokines that recruit LIFR via site 3 i.e. LIF, OSM, CNTF and CT-1 possess these conserved phenylalanine and lysine residues and is known as the FK motif.

== Signal transduction through OSM receptors ==
Signalling by type I and type II OSM receptors have now been shown to be qualitatively distinct. These differences in signaling character, in addition to the tissue distribution profiles of OSMRb and LIFRb, offer another variable in the distinction between the common and specific cellular effects of OSM with respect to LIF. All IL-6 cytokines whether they homo- or heterodimerise gp130 seem to activate JAK1, JAK2 and to a lesser degree Tyk2. JAK1, JAK2, and tyk2 are not interchangeable in the gp130 system, this has been demonstrated with the use of JAK1, Jak2 or Tyk2 deficient cell lines obtained from mutant mice. Cells from JAK1 deficient mice show reduced STAT activation and generation of biological responses in response to IL-6 and LIF. In contrast, fibroblasts derived from JAK2 null mice can respond to IL-6, with demonstratable tyrosine phosphorylation of gp130, JAK1 and TYK2. Thus it seems JAK1 is the critical JAK required for gp130 signalling. Activation of the same Jaks by all three receptor combinations (gp130/gp130, gp130/LIFR, gp130/OSMR) raises the question of how IL6, LIF and OSM can activate distinct intracellular signaling pathways. Selection of particular substrates, i.e. STAT isoform, depended not on which Jak is activated, but instead are determined by specific motifs, especially tyrosine-based motifs, within each receptor intracellular domain.

Aligning the intracellular domains of gp130, LIFR and hOSMR results in some interesting observations. Sequence identity is generally quite low across the group averaging at 4.6%. However, as with many Class I Haematopoeitin receptors, two short membrane proximal motifs, termed box 1 and box 2 are present. In addition these receptors also contain a serine rich region and a third more poorly conserved motif termed box 3. Box 1 is present in all signalling cytokine receptors. It is characteristically rich in proline residues and is essential for the association and activation of JAKs. Box 2 is also important for association with JAKs. Gp130 contains box1 and box2 sequences within the membrane-proximal part of the cytoplasmic region, lying within the minimum 61 amino acids required for receptor activation. Mutations within the box1 region reduce the ability of gp130 to associate with Jaks and abolish ligand-induced activation of Jak1 and Jak2. Box 2 also contributes to activation and binding of JAKs. Studies with various gp130 truncation mutants show a reduction of Jak2 binding and abrogation of certain biological effects upon deletion of box2. However, Jaks are able to associate with gp130 devoid of box2 when overexpressed.

LIFR and OSMR also contain the membrane-proximal box1/box2-like regions. The first 65 amino acid residues in the cytoplasmic domain of LIFR, in combination with full length gp130, can generate signalling on treatment with LIF. Coprecipitation of Jak1, Jak2 and Tyk2 with receptors containing cytoplasmic parts of the LIFR or OSMR. All beta receptor subunits of the gp130 system also possess a box 3 region. This region corresponds to the C-terminal amino acids of the OSMR and LIFR receptors respectively. Box 3 is necessary for the action of OSMR; however Box3 is dispensable for the action of LIFR. In the case of gp130 box 3 is dispensable for activity, however the presence of an intact box 3 sequence is required for certain aspects of gp130 signalling, i.e. stimulation of transcription through the STAT-3 response element. In addition to the poor sequence conservation amongst the intracellular domains of gp130 receptors, the number and position of conserved tyrosine residues are also poorly conserved. For example, LIFR and OSMR share three homologous tyrosines. In contrast none of the tyrosine residues present in the intracellular domain of gp130 share equivalents with LIFR or OSMR, even though the intracellular regions of LIFR and gp130 share more sequence identity than LIFR and OSMR.

Of the proteins recruited to type I cytokine receptors STAT proteins remain the best studied. Homodimerisation of gp130 has been shown to phosphorylate and activate both STAT1 and STAT3. gp130 preferentially activates STAT3 which it can do through four STAT3 activation consensus sequences YXXQ: (YRHQ), (YFKQ), Y905 (YLPQ), Y915 (YMPQ). The lower propensity for STAT1 activation may be a reflection of the lower number of STAT1 activation sequences, YZPQ (where X is any residue and Z is any uncharged residue), namely Y905 and Y915. Cytokines that signal via homodimeric complexes of LIFR or OSMR (i.e. devoid of gp130) are currently unknown in nature. However, various investigators have attempted artificial homodimerisation of LIFR and OSMR intracellular domains, with conflicting results, by constructing receptor chimeras that fuse the extracellular domain of one cytokine receptor with the intracellular domain of LIFR or OSMR.

Signalling by LIFR intracellular domain homodimerisation has been demonstrated in hepatoma and neuroblastoma cells, embryonic stem cells and COS-1 cells by using chimeric receptors that homodimerise upon stimulation with their cognate cytokines (i.e. GCSF, neurotrophin-3, EGF). However a GCSFR/LIFR chimera was not capable of signaling in M1 or Baf cells.

== Anti- or pro-inflammatory? ==
The role of OSM as an inflammatory mediator was clear as early as 1986. Its precise effect on the immune system, as with any cytokine, is far from clear. However, two schools of thought are emerging: The first proposes that OSM is pro-inflammatory; whilst the other holds the opposite view, claiming OSM is anti-inflammatory. Before 1997, differences in human and murine OSM receptor usage were unknown. As a result, several investigators used human OSM in mouse assays and thus any conclusion drawn from the results of these experiments will be representative of LIF, i.e. signalling through gp130/LIFR complexes.

OSM is synthesized by stimulated T-cells and monocytes. The effects of OSM on endothelial cells suggest a pro-inflammatory role for OSM. Endothelial cells possess a large number of OSM receptors. Stimulation of a primary endothelial culture (HUVEC) with hOSM results in delayed but prolonged upregulation of P-selectin, and E-selectin which facilitates leukocyte adhesion and rolling, necessary for their extravasation. OSM also promotes the production of IL-6 from these cells.

As mentioned above the action of OSM as a quencher of the inflammatory response is by no means established yet. For example, conflicting results exist as to the action of OSM on various models of arthritis. For example, OSM reduces the degree of joint destruction in an antibody induced model of rheumatoid arthritis.

OSM is a major growth factor for Kaposi's sarcoma "spindle cells", which are of endothelial origin. These cells do not express LIFR but do express OSMR at high levels. For example, OSM can modulate the expression of IL-6, an important regulator of the host defence system. OSM can regulate the expression of acute phase proteins. OSM regulates the expression of various protease and protease inhibitors, for example Gelatinase and a1-chymotrypsin inhibitor.

== Regulator of haematopoiesis ==
Mice defective for the gene encoding oncostatin M or its receptor OSMR display a slight anaemia and thrombocytopenia. In mice defective for the oncostatin M receptor (OSMR) gene, hematopoietic stem and progenitor cells mobilise more their hematopoietic stem cells into the blood in response to G-CSF or to the CXCR4 antagonist Plerixafor. Likewise injection of specific cytokine trap made of the extracellular domains of OSMR and its co-receptor gp130 enhances hematopoietic stem cell mobilisation in response to G-CSF. Oncostatin M in the bone marrow promotes hematopoietic stem cell proliferation because hematopoietic stem cells from OSMR-deficient mice are more quiescent. RNA sequencing of hematopoietic stem cells from the bone marrow of wildtype versus OSMR-deficient mice have shown that OSMR mediated signalling enhances the expression of genes associated with erythropoiesis (e.g. Gata1, Klf1, Alad) and cell cycling (Ccnb2, Sertad1). These effects of oncostatin M on haematopoiesis are not direct but mediated via bone marrow stromal cells because hematopoietic stem cells do not express OSMR while bone marrow mesenchymal stromal cells and endothelial cells do.

High oncostatin M expression in acute myeloid leukaemia cell is associated with lower survival. Likewise high concentration of OSMR protein in the blood is a poor prognosis biomarker in acute myeloid leukaemia patients. Oncostatin M may also have a role in the pathobiology of myeloproliferative neoplasms.

== See also ==
- Oncostatin M receptor
