= Cytokine receptor =

Protein that binds to a cytokine

Key steps of the JAK-STAT pathway for type 1 and 2 cytokine receptors

Signal transduction. (Cytokine receptor at center left.)

Cytokine receptors are receptors that bind to cytokines. The binding of cytokines to receptors allows the cell that houses the receptor to be able to receive the signals of another cell. These receptors can be found on the surface of cells that allows them to communicate with other cells that transmit their signals This interaction between cells can involve genetic output, cell cycle changes and other signal transduction responses. Cytokine Receptors play a crucial role in Immunological response.

In recent years, the cytokine receptors have come to demand the attention of more investigators than cytokines themselves, partly because of their notable characteristics, and partly because a deficiency of cytokine receptors has now been directly linked to certain debilitating immunodeficiency states. In this regard, and also because the redundancy and pleiotropy of cytokines are a consequence of their homologous receptors, many authorities are now of the opinion that a classification of cytokine receptors would be more clinically and experimentally useful.

== Classification ==
Some cytokine receptors have complex structures, with many of them being multi-chain receptors. The receptor structure determines both its cytokine specificity and its mode of downstream signaling. Because of this, a classification of cytokine receptors based on their three-dimensional structure has been attempted. (Such a classification, though seemingly cumbersome, provides several unique perspectives for attractive pharmacotherapeutic targets.)

- Type I cytokine receptors, whose members have certain conserved motifs in their extracellular amino-acid domain. The IL-2 receptor belongs to this chain, whose γ-chain (common to several other cytokines) deficiency is directly responsible for the x-linked form of Severe Combined Immunodeficiency (X-SCID).
- Type II cytokine receptors, whose members are receptors mainly for interferons.
- Immunoglobulin (Ig) superfamily, which are ubiquitously present throughout several cells and tissues of the vertebrate body
- Tumor necrosis factor receptor family, whose members share a cysteine-rich common extracellular binding domain, and includes several other non-cytokine ligands like receptors, CD40, CD27 and CD30, besides the ligands on which the family is named (TNF).
- Chemokine receptors, two of which acting as binding proteins for HIV (CXCR4 and CCR5). They are G protein coupled receptors.
- TGF-beta receptor family, which are Serine/threonine kinase receptors. Includes the TGF beta receptors

== Comparison ==
Type	Examples	Structure	Mechanism
type I cytokine receptor	Type 1 interleukin receptors; Erythropoietin receptor; GM-CSF receptor; G-CSF receptor; growth hormone receptor; prolactin receptor; Oncostatin M receptor; Leukemia inhibitory factor receptor	Certain conserved motifs in their extracellular amino-acid domain. Connected to Janus kinase (JAK) family of tyrosine kinases. Many have a FN-III superfamily domain and an immunoglobulin-like fold.	JAK phosphorylate and activate downstream proteins involved in their signal transduction pathways
type II cytokine receptor	Type II interleukin receptors; interferon-alpha/beta receptor; interferon-gamma receptor	Certain conserved motifs in their extracellular amino-acid domain. Connected to Janus kinase (JAK) family of tyrosine kinases. Many have a FN-III superfamily domain and an immunoglobulin-like fold.	JAK phosphorylate and activate downstream proteins involved in their signal transduction pathways
Many members of the immunoglobulin superfamily	Interleukin-1 receptor; CSF1; C-kit receptor; Interleukin-18 receptor	Share structural homology with immunoglobulins (antibodies), cell adhesion molecules, and even some cytokine. Includes with the two classes above.	
Tumor necrosis factor receptor family	CD27; CD30; CD40; CD120; Lymphotoxin beta receptor	cysteine-rich common extracellular binding domain	
chemokine receptors	Interleukin-8 receptor; CCR1; CXCR4; MCAF receptor; NAP-2 receptor	Seven transmembrane helix, rhodopsin-like receptor	G protein-coupled
TGF-beta receptor family	TGF beta receptor 1; TGF beta receptor 2	Serine/threonine kinase receptors	Dimeric TGFBR2 binds to TGFB and phosphorylates TGFBR1, which phosphorylates the SMADs. See TGF beta signaling pathway.

== Solubility ==
Cytokine receptors may be both membrane-bound and soluble. Soluble cytokine receptors are extremely common regulators of cytokine function. Soluble cytokine receptors typically consist of the extracellular portions of membrane-bound receptors. .

== Pharmacotherapeutic applications ==
Cytokines and their receptors have a major part in the process of the human body's defense systems, Haematopoiesis, and the proliferation of immune cells. Because of this, many scientists have recognized the potential utilizations that cytokine receptors can have for pharmaceutical treatments. Although cytokine receptors have been studied and documented for decades, there are still ongoing studies that are discovering new functions that pertain to immunology and pharmaceutical applications.

Among these applications is the involvement in cytokines and cytokine receptors in treating immune-mediated inflammatory diseases. These diseases occur when cytokines and cytokine receptors are dysregulated, leading to damage to the tissues and unregulated inflammation in the body. To combat these types of diseases, scientists have developed multiple cytokine receptor-targeting treatments. These newly developed treatments can combat several inflammatory and immune diseases, including rheumatoid arthritis, asthma and psoriasis.

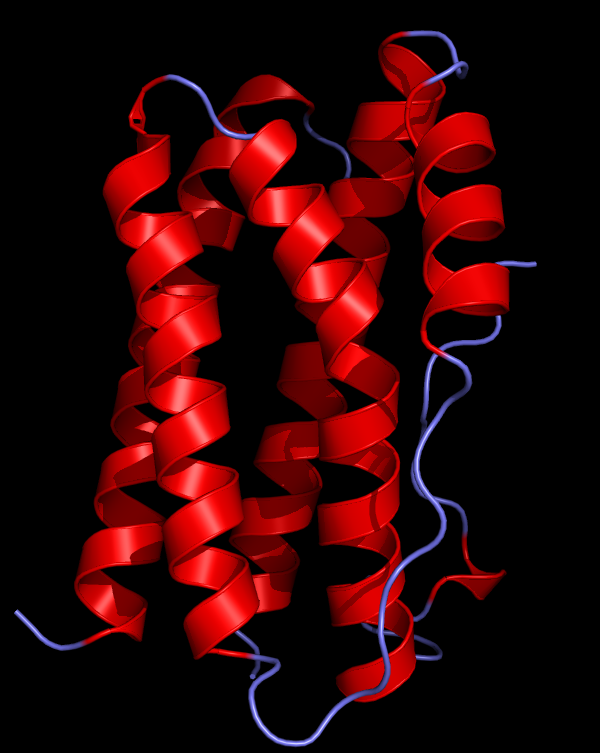
Interleukin-6 structure

One of the cytokines involved in the treatment of immune-mediated inflammatory diseases is interleukin-6 receptor. Dysregulation of this receptor occurs when there is a constant increase of the IL-6 cytokine, causing an increase in binding to the receptor, which promotes inflammation. An influx of binding to the IL-6 receptor can cause inflammation to occur rapidly by activating B cells to produce autoantibodies and over-activating fibroblasts, leading to increased tissue inflammation. This dysregulation can also contribute to Regulatory T cell inhibition, causing inflammation in the body to lack regulation.

To treat diseases that involve the dysregulation of cytokines, a number of treatments are being used and studied. A common method of treating immune-mediated inflammatory diseases is to give monoclonal antibodies that are specific for the IL-6 receptor. Introducing this type of antibody allows it to bind to the IL-6 receptor, which prevents the binding of IL-6 and its dysregulation of the receptor.

Because of the nature of cytokine's pleiotropy, this introduces potential obstacles to utilizing cytokines and cytokine receptors in pharmaceutical and clinical applications. This is because the ability for cytokines to be able to interact with multiple cell types makes it difficult to utilize their characteristics in a clinical setting.

Erythropoietin is sent by the kidneys to stimulate red blood cell production in the bone marrow

Since cytokine receptors play a role in haematopoiesis, cytokine receptors have also been a common topic to study in the treatment of hematopoietic disorders such as anemia. A major cytokine and cytokine receptor in the process of haematopoiesis is erythropoietin and the erythropoietin receptor. Both have important roles in activating and maintaining red blood cell production. Scientists have studied the uses of stimulating erythropoietin and the erythropoietin receptor for the production of red blood cells in diseases such as kidney disease or certain types of anemia.

== See also ==
- STAT protein
