= Pacibekitug =

Monoclonal antibody

Monoclonal antibody
- Type: Whole antibody
- Target: IL6

Clinical data
- Other names: C6414H9868N1698O2008S48
- Routes of administration: Subcutaneous

Identifiers
- CAS Number: 2948444-06-0
- PubChem CID: 472419308
- DrugBank: none
- ChemSpider: none
- UNII: 2NHW9AKY9C
- KEGG: D13049

Chemical and physical data
- Formula: C_{6414}H_{9868}N_{1698}O_{2008}S_{48}
- Molar mass: 144434.26 g·mol^{−1}

Pacibekitug is an investigational monoclonal antibody developed by Tourmaline Bio, Inc., through a license from Pfizer, targeting interleukin-6 (IL-6) for the treatment of inflammatory conditions.

It is administered subcutaneously and is designed to reduce systemic inflammation by inhibiting IL-6, a pro-inflammatory cytokine implicated in various diseases, including cardiovascular disease and chronic kidney disease (CKD).

Pacibekitug is notable for its potential for quarterly dosing, offering a less frequent administration schedule compared to other IL-6 inhibitors.

== Development history ==
In May 2025, pacibekitug was in phase 2 clinical trials, with results demonstrating significant reductions in high-sensitivity C-reactive protein (hsCRP) in CKD patients with elevated inflammation.

In September 2025, Novartis penned a deal to acquire Tourmaline Bio just as pacibekitug was ready to enter phase 3 trials.

== Medical use ==
Pacibekitug is being developed to treat inflammatory conditions associated with elevated IL-6 levels, such as cardiovascular disease and CKD. It aims to reduce systemic inflammation, as measured by biomarkers like hsCRP, which is linked to adverse outcomes in these diseases.

As of May 2025, Pacibekitug has not received regulatory approval and is limited to investigational use in clinical trials.

== Mechanism of action ==
Pacibekitug is a human monoclonal antibody that binds to IL-6, preventing its interaction with the IL-6 receptor and subsequent activation of inflammatory pathways. By neutralizing IL-6, it reduces downstream production of acute-phase reactants like hsCRP, which are markers of systemic inflammation.

This mechanism is similar to other IL-6 inhibitors but is optimized for high potency and an extended half-life.

== Clinical trials ==
=== TRANQUILITY Study ===
The phase 2 TRANQUILITY study evaluated Pacibekitug in patients with stage 3 or 4 CKD and hsCRP levels greater than 2 mg/L, indicating significant inflammation. The open-label, single-arm study enrolled 12 patients who received a single 960 mg subcutaneous dose of Pacibekitug.

Results, announced on May 7, 2025, showed:

- A median hsCRP reduction of 57% at week 12, with 80% of patients achieving hsCRP levels below 2 mg/L.
- Sustained hsCRP reductions through week 24, supporting the potential for quarterly dosing.
- No serious adverse events related to Pacibekitug, with a safety profile consistent with other IL-6 inhibitors.

The study’s findings suggest Pacibekitug’s efficacy in reducing inflammation in CKD patients, a population at high risk for cardiovascular events.Tourmaline Bio plans to initiate a phase 2b study in 2025 to further evaluate dosing regimens and indications, including cardiovascular disease.

== Safety and side effects ==
In the TRANQUILITY study, Pacibekitug was well-tolerated, with no serious adverse events reported.

== See also ==
- ziltivekimab
