= Interleukin-31 receptor =

Protein in humans

The interleukin-31 receptor (IL-31R) is a receptor bound and activated by interleukin-31 (IL-31). It is a heterodimer consisting of IL-31 receptor A (IL31RA) and oncostatin M receptor subunits.
