= Liver regeneration =

Natural regrowth of damaged liver tissue

Liver regeneration is the process by which the liver is able to replace damaged or lost liver tissue. The liver is the only visceral organ with the capacity to regenerate. The liver can regenerate after partial hepatectomy or injury due to hepatotoxic agents such as certain medications, toxins, or chemicals. Only 10% of the original liver mass is required for the organ to regenerate back to full size. The phenomenon of liver regeneration is seen in all vertebrates, from humans to fish. The liver manages to restore any lost mass and adjust its size to that of the organism, while at the same time providing full support for body homeostasis during the entire regenerative process. The process of regeneration in mammals is mainly compensatory growth or hyperplasia because while the lost mass of the liver is replaced, it does not regain its original shape. During compensatory hyperplasia, the remaining liver tissue becomes larger so that the organ can continue to function. In lower species such as fish, the liver can regain both its original size and mass.

== Mechanism ==
The liver is able to regenerate after a partial hepatectomy and damage by hepatotoxins or infection.

Liver regeneration following partial hepatectomy is a very complex and well-coordinated phenomenon. It involves all types of mature liver cells. The process includes growth factors involved in signaling cascades, cytokines, matrix remodeling, and several feedback reactions of stimulation and inhibition of growth related signals.

Liver regeneration following partial hepatectomy occurs in three phases including (a) initiation or priming phase, (b) proliferation phase, and (c) termination phase. Priming phase occurs within 5 hours of hepatectomy and involves activation and over expression of multiple specific genes to prepare the liver cells (hepatocytes) for replication. The regulatory mechanisms prepare hepatocytes to enter the cell cycle. The proliferation phase involves activation of various growth factors, including two factors that play a major role in liver regeneration, EGFR (epidermal growth factor receptor) and c-Met. During this phase, hepatocytes undergo a series of cell division cycles and expansion. Termination phase is coordinated by TGF-β (transforming growth factor beta) that is responsible for stopping the regenerative process and preventing liver overgrowth.

During the first 5 minutes following partial hepatectomy, hemodynamic changes in the liver elevate portal blood pressure, causing turbulent blood flow and mechanical stress on the endothelial cells. The mechanical stress causes epithelial cells to express an increased activity of urokinase plasminogen activator (uPA). Increased uPA activity initiates conversion of plasminogen into plasmin, which breaks down fibrinogen into fibrinogen degradation products (FDPs). Plasmin also causes transformation of pro-matrix metalloproteinases (pro-MMPs) into active matrix metalloproteinases (MMPs). Both, plasmin and MMPs, are responsible for matrix remodeling and turnover of many proteins in the extracellular matrix (ECM). ECM remodeling initiates signaling impulses through integrin and leads to the release of local growth factors. The cascade starts with the uPA coordinated activation of an inactive hepatic growth factor (HGF) that is attached to ECM. Within 30 minutes to 1 hour after partial hepatectomy, active HGF is excreted locally and systematically and it activates hepatic growth factor receptor (HGFR or cMet). At the same time, epidermal growth factor (EGF), produced by duodenal Brunner's glands and released to the portal circulation, stimulates epidermal growth factor receptor (EGFR).

The priming phase of liver regeneration following partial hepatectomy occurs outside of hepatocytes in the ECM and it prepares the liver for regeneration and hepatocyte proliferation. During proliferation phase of liver regeneration, there is a communication between β-catenin, the Notch signaling pathway, and two growth factors, EGF and HGF. β-catenin plays a supportive role in liver regeneration. Wnt/β-catenin signaling is an important coordinator of liver regeneration that starts to operate within 1–3 hours after partial hepatectomy. β-catenin exhibits rapid nuclear translocation in partial hepatectomy model of liver regeneration in rats. Notch pathway is one of the earliest pathways that is turned on within 15–30 min after partial hepatectomy. Notch signaling pathway is generally dependent on two main proteins known as NOTCH-1 receptor and JAGGED-1 (NOTCH-1 ligand), which are markedly up regulated 1–5 days following partial hepatectomy. There is a communication between β-catenin (inside the hepatocyte) and the growth factors EGFR and HGFR or c-Met (outside the hepatocyte). The presence of these two proteins increases the regenerative response because the HGF and EGFR act as direct mitogens inducing a strong mitogenic response from proliferating hepatocytes.

After the liver regeneration process is completed, TGF-β puts an end to the proliferation phase by inducing apoptosis. TGF-β is the most important anti-proliferative factor that stops the process of liver regeneration. TGF-β inhibits the proliferation of hepatocytes by repressing HGF and urokinase activity. This process is able to bring the hepatocytes back into their quiescent state.

Sometimes, hepatocytes do not have the ability to proliferate and an alternative form of regeneration may take place to rebuild the liver. When hepatocytes or biliary cells are unable or blocked from regeneration, these cell types can function as facultative stem cells for each other. When hepatocytes cannot proliferate, biliary epithelial cells are capable of turning into hepatocytes. The reverse can also occur, with hepatocytes turning into biliary cells when biliary cells cannot proliferate. Facultative stem cells have a day-to-day function in the body, but can also function as stem cells for other types of cells when those cells are damaged. These two types of cells can repair liver tissue even when the normal mechanism of liver regeneration fails.

== Liver damage ==
In otherwise healthy patients, the liver is capable of regenerating up to half its mass in 30 days. If patients have underlying liver problems, regeneration may stop before the liver is completely regenerated or the liver may begin to scar. Scarring of the liver is very dangerous and can lead to further serious complications and chronic liver disease. Complications increase when the initial cause of the liver damage is still present. Liver damage can be caused by viruses, alcohol, medications, and other hepatotoxins. Acetaminophen, found in many prescription and over-the-counter medications, is the most common drug that can cause liver damage if taken in a high dose or in conjunction with alcohol. Many liver transplant patients require the transplant because of acetaminophen overdose.

== Liver disease ==
There are multiple causes of liver diseases, including infection, autoimmune and genetic diseases, cancers, alcohol abuse, fat accumulation in the liver (non alcoholic fatty liver disease), prescription drugs, and herbal compounds. Risk factors that increase the probability liver diseases are developed include obesity, type 2 diabetes, tattoos or body piercings, IV drug use, exposure to another person's bodily fluids, unprotected sexual intercourse, and exposure to chemicals and toxins. Examples of different liver diseases include: viral hepatitis A, B, and C, autoimmune diseases such as primary biliary cholangitis (PBC) and primary sclerosing cholangitis (PSC), benign tumors (adenoma, hemangioma), malignancies (liver cancer, bile duct cancer), genetic disorders (hemochromatosis, Wilson's disease, hyperoxaluria).

== Function ==
The liver is a critical organ that is responsible for many different homeostatic functions that help support metabolism, immunity, digestion, detoxification, and carbohydrates and vitamin storage. The detoxification function of the liver exposes the organ to many chemicals, which can induce hepatocyte injury and death. The liver can rapidly regenerate its damaged tissue, preventing liver failure. However, the speed of liver regeneration depends on whether interleukin 6 (IL 6) is overexpressed. IL 6 is a critical component in priming the hepatocytes for proliferation and it has the crucial role in initiation of the acute phase response in hepatocytes. IL 6 is responsible for a rapid increase in production by hepatocytes of many proteins, which assist in controlling acute or chronic inflammation. IL 6 is produced by hepatic macrophages, however, previous studies have shown that it is produced by hepatoma cell lines, suggesting that it may also be produced by hepatocytes themselves. IL 6 binds to its receptor, a complex of gp80 and gp130 subunits, on hepatocytes. Activation of gp130 subunit results in tyrosine kinase activity that phosphorylates a signal transducer and activator of transcription (STAT 3) and an extracellular signal-regulated protein kinase 1 and 2 (ERK1/2), causing an expression of multiple target genes important for hepatocyte proliferation such as Cyclin D1. It was reported that mice deficient in IL 6 have deficient liver regeneration, however, other studies have shown that liver regeneration in these mice is essentially normal, even though there is decreased activation of STAT 3. Mice over-expressing both IL 6 and its soluble receptor have areas of periportal hepatocyte hyperplasia. IL 6 is not a direct mitogen for hepatocytes. IL 6 is probably a factor contributing to optimizing processes of the early stage of liver regeneration, but it should not be viewed as the initiator of the process.

== Diagnosis ==
Detecting the cause and the degree of liver damage is critical to treating liver diseases. Part of the diagnostic process is obtaining the history of drug and alcohol abuse, past viral infections, or any genetic conditions that may run in the family members and can contribute to the liver damage. Other parts of the diagnostic process include blood testing, liver imaging, and a tissue sampling or liver biopsy. Blood tests provide information about the liver function and viral or genetic etiology of liver diseases by checking liver enzymes, viral antigens and antibodies, or genetic testing. Imaging studies reveal the physical condition of the liver and they include ultrasounds, CT scans, and MRIs. Finally, a tissue sample of the liver can be obtained by conducting a liver biopsy. The sampled liver tissue is then studied under a microscope to detect the cause and the degree of liver damage.

== Treatment ==
The treatment of liver diseases will vary depending on the etiology and the degree of liver damage. Treatment for some of the liver diseases may begin with eliminating hepatotoxins such alcohol or acetaminophen by simple lifestyle modifications; cutting back on alcohol consumption, acetaminophen intake, or weight loss could be the initial step of the treatment process. More complicated liver diseases including liver cancer may require more advanced or invasive procedures such as ablation or embolization. The most complicated form of the treatment of end stage liver diseases is the liver transplant.

== In mythology ==
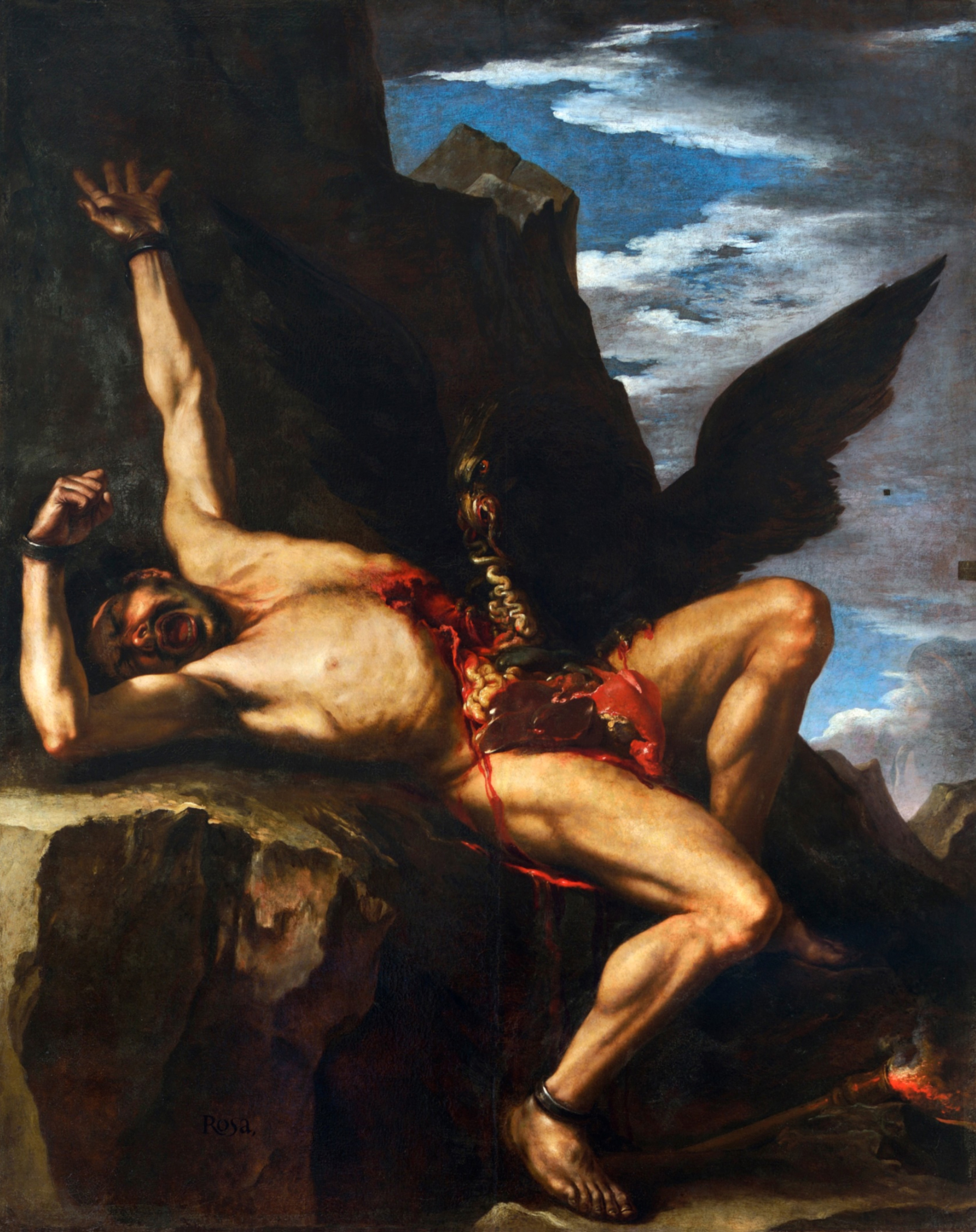
La tortura de Prometeo, (The Torture of Prometheus), Salvator Rosa, 1646-1648.

In Greek mythology, Prometheus and Tityus are transgressors of the gods whose punishments involve their livers being devoured by birds of prey during the day and regenerated at night.
