= Interleukin 11 receptor alpha subunit =

Protein-coding gene in the species Homo sapiens

IL11RA

Identifiers
- Aliases: IL11RA, CRSDA, Interleukin 11 receptor alpha subunit, interleukin 11 receptor subunit alpha
- External IDs: OMIM: 600939; MGI: 109123; GeneCards: IL11RA

Gene location (Human)
Chr.	Chromosome 9 (human)
Band	9p13.3	Start	34,652,162 bp
Band	9p13.3	End	34,661,902 bp

Gene location (Mouse)
Chr.	Chromosome 4 (mouse)
Band	4 A5|4 22.73 cM	Start	42,656,001 bp
Band	4 A5|4 22.73 cM	End	42,665,763 bp
RNA expression pattern
Bgee	Human / Mouse (ortholog); Top expressed in: apex of heart; Descending thoracic aorta; right auricle of heart; ascending aorta; granulocyte; muscle layer of sigmoid colon; right coronary artery; right hemisphere of cerebellum; left lobe of thyroid gland; left uterine tube / Top expressed in: granular layer of epidermis; spermatocyte; dental follicle; blood vessel; third ventricle; cartilage tissue; tracheobronchial tree; bronchus; tongue; dermis; More reference expression data
BioGPS	n/a
Gene ontology
Molecular function	cytokine receptor activity; transmembrane signaling receptor activity; signal transducer activity; interleukin-11 receptor activity; cytokine binding; interleukin-11 binding
Cellular component	integral component of membrane; plasma membrane; integral component of plasma membrane; membrane; external side of plasma membrane; receptor complex
Biological process	head development; embryo implantation; developmental process; cytokine-mediated signaling pathway; positive regulation of cell population proliferation; interleukin-11-mediated signaling pathway
Sources:Amigo / QuickGO
Orthologs
Databases	NCBI: entry; OMA: entry
Species	Human	Mouse
Entrez	3590	16158
Ensembl	ENSG00000137070	ENSMUSG00000078735
UniProt	Q14626	P70225
RefSeq (mRNA)	NM_001142784; NM_004512; NM_147162	NM_010550
RefSeq (protein)	NP_001136256	NP_001092818; NP_001365603
Location (UCSC)	Chr 9: 34.65 – 34.66 Mb	Chr 4: 42.66 – 42.67 Mb
PubMed search
- Wikidata
View/Edit Human	View/Edit Mouse

Interleukin 11 receptor, alpha subunit is a subunit of the interleukin 11 receptor. IL11RA is its human gene.

Interleukin 11 is a stromal cell-derived cytokine that belongs to a family of pleiotropic and redundant cytokines that use the gp130 transducing subunit in their high affinity receptors. This gene encodes the IL-11 receptor, which is a member of the hematopoietic cytokine receptor family. This particular receptor is very similar to ciliary neurotrophic factor, since both contain an extracellular region with a 2-domain structure composed of an immunoglobulin-like domain and a cytokine receptor-like domain. Alternative splicing has been observed at this locus and two variants, each encoding a distinct isoform, have been identified.
