= Glycoprotein 130 =

Mammalian protein found in Homo sapiens

IL6ST
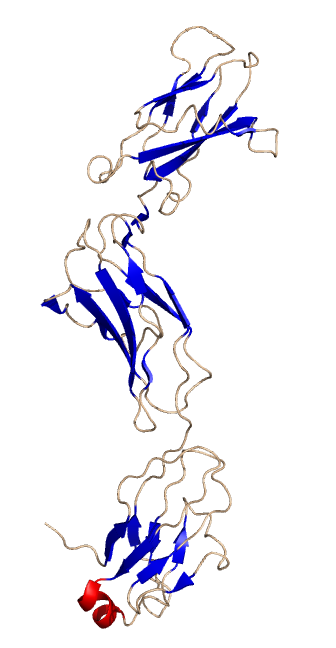

Identifiers
- Aliases: IL6ST, CD130, CDW130, GP130, IL-6RB, interleukin 6 signal transducer
- External IDs: OMIM: 600694; MGI: 96560; GeneCards: IL6ST
Available structures
| PDB | Ortholog search: PDBe RCSB |
| PDB | List of PDB id codes 1BJ8, 1BQU, 1I1R, 1P9M, 1PVH, 3L5H, 3L5I, 3L5J,%%s1BJ8, 1BQU, 1I1R, 1P9M, 1PVH, 3L5H, 3L5I, 3L5J, 1N2Q |

Gene location (Human)
| Chr. | Chromosome 5 (human) |
| Band | 5q11.2 | Start | 55,935,095 bp |
| Band | 5q11.2 | End | 55,994,993 bp |

Gene location (Mouse)
| Chr. | Chromosome 13 (mouse) |
| Band | 13 D2.2|13 63.73 cM | Start | 112,600,604 bp |
| Band | 13 D2.2|13 63.73 cM | End | 112,646,620 bp |
RNA expression pattern
| Bgee | Human / Mouse (ortholog); Top expressed in: parietal pleura; germinal epithelium; visceral pleura; seminal vesicula; caput epididymis; tail of epididymis; superficial temporal artery; pericardium; lactiferous duct; lower lobe of lung / Top expressed in: decidua; skin of external ear; uterus; mesenteric lymph nodes; right lung; right lung lobe; gastrula; carotid body; urinary bladder; cardiac muscle tissue of left ventricle; More reference expression data |
| BioGPS | n/a |
Gene ontology
| Molecular function | interleukin-11 binding; leukemia inhibitory factor receptor activity; ciliary neurotrophic factor receptor binding; interleukin-27 receptor activity; ciliary neurotrophic factor receptor activity; cytokine receptor activity; protein homodimerization activity; interleukin-6 receptor binding; growth factor binding; interleukin-11 receptor activity; oncostatin-M receptor activity; interleukin-6 receptor activity; interleukin-6 binding; protein binding; cytokine binding; identical protein binding |
| Cellular component | extracellular exosome; extracellular region; integral component of membrane; cell body; ciliary neurotrophic factor receptor complex; membrane; soma; dendrite; plasma membrane; interleukin-6 receptor complex; oncostatin-M receptor complex; external side of plasma membrane; extracellular space; receptor complex |
| Biological process | regulation of Notch signaling pathway; positive regulation of cardiac muscle hypertrophy; negative regulation of apoptotic process; negative regulation of interleukin-6-mediated signaling pathway; interleukin-11-mediated signaling pathway; response to cytokine; oncostatin-M-mediated signaling pathway; signal transduction; interleukin-27-mediated signaling pathway; positive regulation of adaptive immune response; ciliary neurotrophic factor-mediated signaling pathway; leukemia inhibitory factor signaling pathway; viral process; positive regulation of T cell proliferation; interleukin-6-mediated signaling pathway; positive regulation of acute inflammatory response; cytokine-mediated signaling pathway; positive regulation of astrocyte differentiation; positive regulation of osteoblast differentiation; glycogen metabolic process; positive regulation of vascular endothelial growth factor production; positive regulation of cell population proliferation; positive regulation of tyrosine phosphorylation of STAT protein; interleukin-12-mediated signaling pathway; interleukin-35-mediated signaling pathway |
Sources:Amigo / QuickGO
Orthologs
| Databases | NCBI: entry; OMA: entry |
| Species | Human | Mouse |
| Entrez | 3572 | 16195 |
| Ensembl | ENSG00000134352 | ENSMUSG00000021756 |
| UniProt | P40189; Q17RA0 | Q00560 |
| RefSeq (mRNA) | NM_001190981; NM_002184; NM_175767 | NM_010560 |
| RefSeq (protein) | NP_001177910; NP_002175; NP_786943; NP_001351204; NP_001351205 NP_001351206; NP_001351207; NP_001351208; NP_002175.2; NP_001177910.1 | NP_034690 |
| Location (UCSC) | Chr 5: 55.94 – 55.99 Mb | Chr 13: 112.6 – 112.65 Mb |
| PubMed search |
- Wikidata
| View/Edit Human | View/Edit Mouse |

Glycoprotein 130 (also known as gp130, IL6ST, IL6R-beta or CD130) is a transmembrane protein which is the founding member of the class of tall cytokine receptors. It forms one subunit of the type I cytokine receptor within the IL-6 receptor family. It is often referred to as the common gp130 subunit, and is important for signal transduction following cytokine engagement. As with other type I cytokine receptors, gp130 possesses a WSXWS amino acid motif that ensures correct protein folding and ligand binding. It interacts with Janus kinases to elicit an intracellular signal following receptor interaction with its ligand. Structurally, gp130 is composed of five fibronectin type-III domains and one immunoglobulin-like C2-type (immunoglobulin-like) domain in its extracellular portion.

== Characteristics ==
The members of the IL-6 receptor family are all complex with gp130 for signal transduction. For example, IL-6 binds to the IL-6 Receptor. The complex of these two proteins then associates with gp130. This complex of 3 proteins then homodimerizes to form a hexameric complex which can produce downstream signals. There are many other proteins which associate with gp130, such as cardiotrophin 1 (CT-1), leukemia inhibitory factor (LIF), ciliary neurotrophic factor (CNTF), oncostatin M (OSM), and IL-11. There are also several other proteins which have structural similarity to gp130 and contain the WSXWS motif and preserved cysteine residues. Members of this group include LIF-R, OSM-R, and G-CSF-R.

== Inhibition of gp130 ==
gp130 is an important part of many different types of signaling complexes. Inactivation of gp130 during development is lethal to mice. Homozygous mice who are born show a number of defects including impaired development of the ventricular myocardium. Haematopoietic effects included reduced numbers of stem cells in the spleen and liver. Loss of gp130 in the adult mouse, either globally or in a tissue-specific manner, is however increasingly linked with beneficial effects in a number of mouse models of disease. Of note, soluble gp130 (sgp130), which was thought a specific inhibitor of IL6 trans signalling, was instead found to inhibit not only IL6 signalling but also multiple other IL6-family cytokines (e.g. OSM, IL11 and CNTF). Thus the widespread benefits of sgp130 in mouse models, and in human trials, may represent the benefits of global (or near global) inhibition of gp130. This suggests gp130 itself as a therapeutic target for human diseases including sepsis, systemic sclerosis, inflammatory bowel disease, among others.

== Signal transduction ==
gp130 has no intrinsic tyrosine kinase activity. Instead, it is phosphorylated on tyrosine residues after complexing with other proteins. The phosphorylation leads to association with JAK/Tyk tyrosine kinases and STAT protein transcription factors. In particular, STAT-3 is activated which leads to the activation of many downstream genes. Other pathways activated include RAS and MAPK signaling.

== Interactions ==
Glycoprotein 130 has been shown to interact with:

- Grb2,
- HER2/neu,
- Janus kinase 1
- Leukemia inhibitory factor receptor,
- PTPN11,
- SHC1,
- SOCS3, and
- TLE1.
