= Interleukin-11 receptor =

Type I cytokine receptor

interleukin 11 receptor, alpha

Identifiers
- Symbol: IL11RA
- NCBI gene: 3590
- HGNC: 5967
- OMIM: 600939
- RefSeq: NM_004512
- UniProt: Q14626

Other data
- Locus: Chr. 9 p13
Search for
- Structures: Swiss-model
- Domains: InterPro

interleukin 11 receptor, beta

Identifiers
- Symbol: IL11RB
- HGNC: 5968

The interleukin 11 receptor is a type I cytokine receptor, binding interleukin 11. It is a heterodimer composed of an interleukin 11 receptor alpha subunit and an incompletely characterized beta subunit.
