= Interleukin 6 =

Cytokine protein

IL6
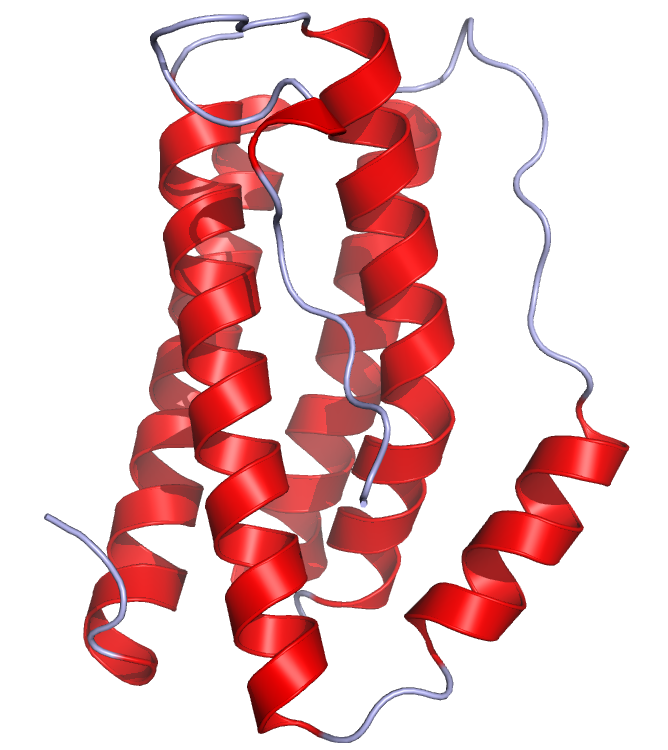

Identifiers
- Aliases: IL6, BSF2, HGF, HSF, IFNB2, IL-6, BSF-2, CDF, IFN-beta-2, interleukin 6
- External IDs: OMIM: 147620; MGI: 96559; GeneCards: IL6
Available structures
PDB	Ortholog search: PDBe RCSB
PDB	List of PDB id codes 4O9H, 1ALU, 1IL6, 1P9M, 2IL6, 4CNI, 4J4L, 4NI7, 4NI9, 4ZS7

Gene location (Human)
Chr.	Chromosome 7 (human)
Band	7p15.3	Start	22,725,884 bp
Band	7p15.3	End	22,732,002 bp

Gene location (Mouse)
Chr.	Chromosome 5 (mouse)
Band	5 B1|5 15.7 cM	Start	30,218,112 bp
Band	5 B1|5 15.7 cM	End	30,224,979 bp
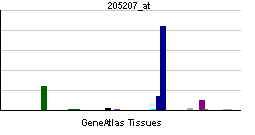
RNA expression pattern
Bgee	Human / Mouse (ortholog); Top expressed in: cartilage tissue; vena cava; gallbladder; left uterine tube; gonad; smooth muscle tissue; mucosa of urinary bladder; upper lobe of left lung; islet of Langerhans; testicle / Top expressed in: embryo; stroma of bone marrow; blastocyst; endothelial cell of lymphatic vessel; spermatocyte; spermatid; granulocyte; lumbar spinal ganglion; islet of Langerhans; atrioventricular valve; More reference expression data
BioGPS	More reference expression data
Gene ontology
Molecular function	cytokine activity; growth factor activity; interleukin-6 receptor binding; protein binding
Cellular component	extracellular region; interleukin-6 receptor complex; extracellular space; endoplasmic reticulum lumen
Biological process	regulation of angiogenesis; positive regulation of translation; platelet activation; humoral immune response; defense response to virus; response to peptidoglycan; neuron projection development; defense response to Gram-positive bacterium; negative regulation of fat cell differentiation; positive regulation of peptidyl-serine phosphorylation; positive regulation of leukocyte chemotaxis; positive regulation of T cell proliferation; positive regulation of interleukin-6 production; positive regulation of peptidyl-tyrosine phosphorylation; positive regulation of acute inflammatory response; inflammatory response; negative regulation of collagen biosynthetic process; positive regulation of MAPK cascade; hepatic immune response; monocyte chemotaxis; positive regulation of DNA-binding transcription factor activity; negative regulation of apoptotic process; positive regulation of osteoblast differentiation; positive regulation of NF-kappaB transcription factor activity; acute-phase response; immune response; regulation of vascular endothelial growth factor production; positive regulation of chemokine production; negative regulation of lipid storage; neutrophil mediated immunity; positive regulation of smooth muscle cell proliferation; positive regulation of type B pancreatic cell apoptotic process; response to glucocorticoid; defense response to Gram-negative bacterium; positive regulation of cell population proliferation; positive regulation of apoptotic process; positive regulation of B cell activation; post-translational protein modification; regulation of signaling receptor activity; positive regulation of tyrosine phosphorylation of STAT protein; neutrophil apoptotic process; negative regulation of cell population proliferation; positive regulation of gene expression; endocrine pancreas development; negative regulation of bone resorption; positive regulation of transcription, DNA-templated; positive regulation of transcription by RNA polymerase II; glucagon secretion; cellular response to hydrogen peroxide; cellular response to lipopolysaccharide; T-helper 17 cell lineage commitment; positive regulation of T-helper 2 cell cytokine production; negative regulation of interleukin-1-mediated signaling pathway; cytokine-mediated signaling pathway; interleukin-6-mediated signaling pathway; positive regulation of receptor signaling pathway via JAK-STAT; signal transduction
Sources:Amigo / QuickGO
Orthologs
Databases	NCBI: entry; OMA: entry
Species	Human	Mouse
Entrez	3569	16193
Ensembl	ENSG00000136244	ENSMUSG00000025746
UniProt	P05231	P08505
RefSeq (mRNA)	NM_000600; NM_001318095; NM_001371096	NM_031168; NM_001314054
RefSeq (protein)	NP_000591; NP_001305024; NP_001358025	NP_001300983; NP_112445
Location (UCSC)	Chr 7: 22.73 – 22.73 Mb	Chr 5: 30.22 – 30.22 Mb
PubMed search
- Wikidata
View/Edit Human	View/Edit Mouse

Interleukin 6 (IL-6) is an interleukin that acts as both a pro-inflammatory cytokine and an anti-inflammatory myokine. In humans, it is encoded by the IL6 gene.

In addition, osteoblasts secrete IL-6 to stimulate osteoclast formation. Smooth muscle cells in the tunica media of many blood vessels also produce IL-6 as a pro-inflammatory cytokine. IL-6's role as an anti-inflammatory myokine is mediated through its inhibitory effects on TNF and IL-1 and its activation of IL-1ra and IL-10.

There is some early evidence that IL-6 can be used as an inflammatory marker for severe COVID-19 infection with poor prognosis, in the context of the wider coronavirus pandemic.

== Function ==
=== Immune system ===
IL-6 is secreted by macrophages in response to specific microbial molecules, referred to as pathogen-associated molecular patterns (PAMPs). These PAMPs bind to an important group of detection molecules of the innate immune system, called pattern recognition receptors (PRRs), including Toll-like receptors (TLRs). These are present on the cell surface and intracellular compartments and induce intracellular signaling cascades that give rise to inflammatory cytokine production. IL-6 is an important mediator of fever and of the acute phase response.

IL-6 is responsible for stimulating acute phase protein synthesis, as well as the production of neutrophils in the bone marrow. It supports the growth of B cells and is antagonistic to regulatory T cells.

=== Metabolic ===
It is capable of crossing the blood–brain barrier and initiating synthesis of PGE_{2} in the hypothalamus, thereby changing the body's temperature setpoint. In muscle and fatty tissue, IL-6 stimulates energy mobilization that leads to increased body temperature. At 4 °C, both the oxygen consumption and core temperature were lower in IL-6^{-/-} compared with wild-type mice, suggesting a lower cold-induced thermogenesis in IL-6^{-/-} mice.

In the absence of inflammation 10–35% of circulating IL-6 may come from adipose tissue. IL-6 is produced by adipocytes and is thought to be a reason why obese individuals have higher endogenous levels of CRP. IL-6 may exert a tonic suppression of body fat in mature mice, given that IL-6 gene knockout causes mature onset obesity. Moreover, IL-6 can suppress body fat mass via effects at the level of the CNS. The antiobesity effect of IL-6 in rodents is exerted at the level of the brain, presumably the hypothalamus and the hindbrain. On the other hand, enhanced central IL-6 trans-signaling may improve energy and glucose homeostasis in obesity Trans-signaling implicates that a soluble form of IL-6R (sIL-6R) comprising the extracellular portion of the receptor can bind IL-6 with a similar affinity as the membrane bound IL-6R. The complex of IL-6 and sIL-6R can bind to gp130 on cells, which do not express the IL-6R, and which are unresponsive to IL-6.

Studies in experimental animals indicate that IL-6 in the CNS partly mediates the suppression of food intake and body weight exerted by glucagon-like peptide-1 (GLP-1) receptor stimulation.

Outside the CNS, it seems that IL-6 stimulates the production of GLP-1 in the endocrine pancreas and the gut. Amylin is another substance that can reduce body weight, and that may interact with IL-6. Amylin-induced IL-6 production in the ventromedial hypothalamus (VMH) is a possible mechanism by which amylin treatment could interact with VMH leptin signaling to increase its effect on weight loss.

It is assumed that interleukin 6 in the liver activates the homologue of the human longevity gene mINDY expression via binding to its IL-6-receptor, which is associated with activation of the transcription factor STAT3 (which binds to the binding site in the mIndy promoter) and thereby rise of citrate uptake and hepatic lipogenesis.

=== Central nervous system ===
Intranasally administered IL-6 has been shown to improve sleep-associated consolidation of emotional memories.

There are indications of interactions between GLP-1 and IL-6 in several parts of the brain. One example is the parabrachial nuclei of the pons, where GLP-1 increases IL-6 levels and where IL-6 exerts a marked anti-obesity effect.

== Role as myokine ==
IL-6 is also considered a myokine, a cytokine produced from muscle, which is elevated in response to muscle contraction. It is significantly elevated with exercise, and precedes the appearance of other cytokines in the circulation. During exercise, it is thought to act in a hormone-like manner to mobilize extracellular substrates and/or augment substrate delivery.

Like in humans, there seems to be an increase in IL-6 expression in working muscle and plasma IL-6 concentration during exercise in rodents. Studies in mice with IL-6 gene knockout indicate that lack of IL-6 in mice affect exercise function.

It has been shown that the reduction of abdominal obesity by exercise in human adults can be reversed by the IL-6 receptor blocking antibody tocilizumab. Together with the findings that IL-6 prevents obesity, stimulates lipolysis and is released from skeletal muscle during exercise, the tocilizumab finding indicates that IL-6 is required for exercise to reduce visceral adipose tissue mass. Bone may be another organ affected by exercise induced IL-6, given that muscle-derived interleukin 6 has been reported to increase exercise capacity by signaling in osteoblasts.

IL-6 has extensive anti-inflammatory functions in its role as a myokine. IL-6 was the first myokine that was found to be secreted into the blood stream in response to muscle contractions. Aerobic exercise provokes a systemic cytokine response, including, for example, IL-6, IL-1 receptor antagonist (IL-1ra), and IL-10. IL-6 was serendipitously discovered as a myokine because of the observation that it increased in an exponential fashion proportional to the length of exercise and the amount of muscle mass engaged in the exercise. It has been consistently demonstrated that the plasma concentration of IL-6 increases during muscular exercise. This increase is followed by the appearance of IL-1ra and the anti-inflammatory cytokine IL-10. In general, the cytokine response to exercise and sepsis differs with regard to TNF-α. Thus, the cytokine response to exercise is not preceded by an increase in plasma-TNF-α. Following exercise, the basal plasma IL-6 concentration may increase up to 100-fold, but less dramatic increases are more frequent. The exercise-induced increase of plasma IL-6 occurs in an exponential manner and the peak IL-6 level is reached at the end of the exercise or shortly thereafter. It is the combination of mode, intensity, and duration of the exercise that determines the magnitude of the exercise-induced increase of plasma IL-6.

IL-6 had previously been classified as a proinflammatory cytokine. Therefore, it was first thought that the exercise-induced IL-6 response was related to muscle damage. However, it has become evident that eccentric exercise is not associated with a larger increase in plasma IL-6 than exercise involving concentric "nondamaging" muscle contractions. This finding clearly demonstrates that muscle damage is not required to provoke an increase in plasma IL-6 during exercise. As a matter of fact, eccentric exercise may result in a delayed peak and a much slower decrease of plasma IL-6 during recovery.

Recent work has shown that both upstream and downstream signalling pathways for IL-6 differ markedly between myocytes and macrophages. It appears that unlike IL-6 signalling in macrophages, which is dependent upon activation of the NFκB signalling pathway, intramuscular IL-6 expression is regulated by a network of signalling cascades, including the Ca^{2+}/NFAT and glycogen/p38 MAPK pathways. Thus, when IL-6 is signalling in monocytes or macrophages, it creates a pro-inflammatory response, whereas IL-6 activation and signalling in muscle is totally independent of a preceding TNF-response or NFκB activation, and is anti-inflammatory.

IL-6, among an increasing number of other recently identified myokines, thus remains an important topic in myokine research. It appears in muscle tissue and in the circulation during exercise at levels up to one hundred times basal rates, as noted, and is seen as having a beneficial impact on health and bodily functioning when elevated in response to physical exercise.

== Receptor ==
IL-6 signals through a cell-surface type I cytokine receptor complex consisting of the ligand-binding IL-6Rα chain (CD126), and the signal-transducing component gp130 (also called CD130). CD130 is the common signal transducer for several cytokines including leukemia inhibitory factor (LIF), ciliary neurotropic factor, oncostatin M, IL-11 and cardiotrophin-1, and is almost ubiquitously expressed in most tissues. In contrast, the expression of CD126 is restricted to certain tissues. As IL-6 interacts with its receptor, it triggers the gp130 and IL-6R proteins to form a complex, thus activating the receptor. These complexes bring together the intracellular regions of gp130 to initiate a signal transduction cascade through certain transcription factors, Janus kinases (JAKs) and Signal Transducers and Activators of Transcription (STATs).

IL-6 is probably the best-studied of the cytokines that use gp130, also known as IL-6 signal transducer (IL6ST), in their signalling complexes. Other cytokines that signal through receptors containing gp130 are Interleukin 11 (IL-11), Interleukin 27 (IL-27), ciliary neurotrophic factor (CNTF), cardiotrophin-1 (CT-1), cardiotrophin-like cytokine (CLC), leukemia inhibitory factor (LIF), oncostatin M (OSM), Kaposi's sarcoma-associated herpesvirus interleukin 6-like protein (KSHV-IL6). These cytokines are commonly referred to as the IL-6 like or gp130 utilising cytokines

In addition to the membrane-bound receptor, a soluble form of IL-6R (sIL-6R) has been purified from human serum and urine. Many neuronal cells are unresponsive to stimulation by IL-6 alone, but differentiation and survival of neuronal cells can be mediated through the action of sIL-6R. The sIL-6R/IL-6 complex can stimulate neurites outgrowth and promote survival of neurons and, hence, may be important in nerve regeneration through remyelination.

== Interactions ==
Interleukin-6 has been shown to interact with interleukin-6 receptor, glycoprotein 130, and Galectin-3.

There is considerable functional overlap and interaction between Substance P (SP), the natural ligand for the neurokinin type 1 receptor (NK1R, a mediator of immunomodulatory activity) and IL-6.

== Role in disease ==
IL-6 stimulates the inflammatory and auto-immune processes in many diseases such as multiple sclerosis, neuromyelitis optica spectrum disorder (NMOSD), diabetes, atherosclerosis, gastric cancer, depression, Alzheimer's disease, systemic lupus erythematosus, multiple myeloma, prostate cancer, Behçet's disease, rheumatoid arthritis, and intracerebral hemorrhage.

Hence, there is an interest in developing anti-IL-6 agents as therapy against many of these diseases. The first such is tocilizumab, which has been approved for rheumatoid arthritis, Castleman's disease and systemic juvenile idiopathic arthritis. Others are in clinical trials. It has been observed that genetic inactivation of ZCCHC 6 suppresses IL‐6 expression and reduces the severity of experimental osteoarthritis in Mice. Some plant derived small molecule such as Butein have been reported to inhibit IL-6 expression in IL-1β stimulated human chondrocytes.

=== Liver diseases ===
Since IL-6 is a well-known pleiotropic molecule, it plays a dual role in the pathogenesis of liver diseases. While it is necessary for promoting liver regeneration, IL-6 is also a highly recognized marker of systemic inflammation and its association with mortality in liver diseases has been reported by multiple studies. In patients with severe alcohol-associated hepatitis, IL-6 showed the most robust elevation among inflammatory cytokines compared to healthy controls with a further increase in non-survivors. In these patients, IL-6 was a predictor of short-term (28- and 90-day) mortality.

=== Rheumatoid arthritis ===
The first FDA approved anti-IL-6 treatment was for rheumatoid arthritis (RA).

Since IL-6 and its signalling play an important role in the inflammatory processes underlying rheumatoid arthritis, several therapeutic agents have been developed to inhibit this pathway. These agents have been developed to target either the IL-6 cytokine itself, although no IL-6-targeting drug is currenlty approved for RA in the EU or US, or to target the IL-6 receptor, as exemplified by tocilizumab and sarilumab, both of which are approved for the treament of RA.

=== Cancer ===
Anti-IL-6 therapy was initially developed for treatment of autoimmune diseases, but due to the role of IL-6 in chronic inflammation, IL-6 blockade was also evaluated for cancer treatment. IL-6 was seen to have roles in tumor microenvironment regulation, production of breast cancer stem cell-like cells, metastasis through down-regulation of E-cadherin, and alteration of DNA methylation in oral cancer.

Advanced/metastatic cancer patients have higher levels of IL-6 in their blood. One example of this is pancreatic cancer, with noted elevation of IL-6 present in patients correlating with poor survival rates.

=== Diseases ===
==== Enterovirus 71 ====
High IL-6 levels are associated with the development of encephalitis in children and immunodeficient mouse models infected with Enterovirus 71; this highly contagious virus normally causes a milder illness called hand, foot, and mouth disease but can cause life-threatening encephalitis in some cases. EV71 patients with a certain gene polymorphism in IL-6 also appear to be more susceptible to developing encephalitis.

=== Epigenetic modifications ===
IL-6 has been shown to lead to several neurological diseases through its impact on epigenetic modification within the brain. IL-6 activates the phosphoinositide 3-kinase (PI3K) pathway, and a downstream target of this pathway is the protein kinase B (PKB) (Hodge et al., 2007). IL-6 activated PKB can phosphorylate the nuclear localization signal on DNA methyltransferase-1 (DNMT1). This phosphorylation causes movement of DNMT1 to the nucleus, where it can be transcribed. DNMT1 recruits other DNMTs, including DNMT3A and DNMT3B, which, as a complex, recruit HDAC1. This complex adds methyl groups to CpG islands on gene promoters, repressing the chromatin structure surrounding the DNA sequence and inhibiting transcriptional machinery from accessing the gene to induce transcription. Increased IL-6, therefore, can hypermethylate DNA sequences and subsequently decrease gene expression through its effects on DNMT1 expression.

==== Schizophrenia ====
The induction of epigenetic modification by IL-6 has been proposed as a mechanism in the pathology of schizophrenia through the hypermethylation and repression of the GAD67 promoter. This hypermethylation may potentially lead to the decreased GAD67 levels seen in the brains of people with schizophrenia. GAD67 may be involved in the pathology of schizophrenia through its effect on GABA levels and on neural oscillations. Neural oscillations occur when inhibitory GABAergic neurons fire synchronously and cause inhibition of a multitude of target excitatory neurons at the same time, leading to a cycle of inhibition and disinhibition. These neural oscillations are impaired in schizophrenia, and these alterations may be responsible for both positive and negative symptoms of schizophrenia.

==== Aging ====
IL-6 is commonly found in the senescence-associated secretory phenotype (SASP) factors secreted by senescent cells (a toxic cell-type that increases with aging). Cancer (a disease that increases with age) invasiveness is promoted primarily though the actions of the SASP factors metalloproteinase, chemokine, IL-6, and interleukin 8 (IL-8). IL-6 and IL-8 are the most conserved and robust features of SASP.

Myelodysplastic Syndromes

IL-6 receptor was found upregulated in high-risk MDS patients. The inhibition of IL-6 signaling pathway can significantly ameliorate the clonogenicity of MDS hematopoietic stem and progenitor cells (HSPCs), but have undetectable effect on normal HSPCs.

==== Depression and major depressive disorder ====
The epigenetic effects IL-6 have also been implicated in the pathology of depression. The effects of IL-6 on depression are mediated through the repression of brain-derived neurotrophic factor (BDNF) expression in the brain; DNMT1 hypermethylates the BDNF promoter and reduces BDNF levels. Altered BDNF function has been implicated in depression, which is likely due to epigenetic modification following IL-6 upregulation. BDNF is a neurotrophic factor implicated in spine formation, density, and morphology on neurons. Downregulation of BDNF, therefore, may cause decreased connectivity in the brain. Depression is marked by altered connectivity, in particular between the anterior cingulate cortex and several other limbic areas, such as the hippocampus. The anterior cingulate cortex is responsible for detecting incongruences between expectation and perceived experience. Altered connectivity of the anterior cingulate cortex in depression, therefore, may cause altered emotions following certain experiences, leading to depressive reactions. This altered connectivity is mediated by IL-6 and its effect on epigenetic regulation of BDNF.

Additional preclinical and clinical data, suggest that Substance P [SP] and IL-6 may act in concert to promote major depression. SP, a hybrid neurotransmitter-cytokine, is co-transmitted with BDNF through paleo-spinothalamic circuitry from the periphery with collaterals into key areas of the limbic system. However, both IL6 and SP mitigate expression of BDNF in brain regions associated with negative affect and memory. SP and IL6 both relax tight junctions of the blood brain barrier, such that effects seen in fMRI experiments with these molecules may be a bidirectional mix of neuronal, glial, capillary, synaptic, paracrine, or endocrine-like effects. At the cellular level, SP is noted to increase expression of interleukin-6 (IL-6) through PI-3K, p42/44 and p38 MAP kinase pathways. Data suggest that nuclear translocation of NF-κB regulates IL-6 overexpression in SP-stimulated cells. This is of key interest as: 1) a meta-analysis indicates an association of major depressive disorder, C-reactive protein and IL6 plasma concentrations, 2) NK1R antagonists [five molecules] studied by 3 independent groups in over 2000 patients from 1998 to 2013 validate the mechanism as dose-related, fully effective antidepressant, with a unique safety profile. (see Summary of NK1RAs in Major Depression), 3) the preliminary observation that plasma concentrations of IL6 are elevated in depressed patients with cancer, and 4) selective NK1RAs may eliminate endogenous SP stress-induced augmentation of IL-6 secretion pre-clinically. These and many other reports suggest that a clinical study of a neutralizing IL-6 biological or drug based antagonist is likely warranted in patients with major depressive disorder, with or without co-morbid chronic inflammatory based illnesses; that the combination of NK1RAs and IL6 blockers may represent a new, potentially biomarkable approach to major depression, and possibly bipolar disorder.

The IL-6 antibody sirukumab underwent clinical trials for adjunctive treatment of major depressive disorder in 2015–2018, but this research has been discontinued.

=== Asthma ===
Obesity is a known risk factor in the development of severe asthma. Recent data suggests that the inflammation associated with obesity, potentially mediated by IL-6, plays a role in causing poor lung function and increased risk for developing asthma exacerbations.

== Protein superfamily ==
Interleukin is the main member of the IL-6 superfamily (Pfam PF00489), which also includes G-CSF, IL23A, and CLCF1. A viral version of IL6 is found in Kaposi's sarcoma-associated herpesvirus.

== See also ==
- Ziltivekimab, a fully human monoclonal antibody against interleukin 6.
