= Cardiotrophin 1 =

Protein-coding gene in the species Homo sapiens

CTF1

Identifiers
- Aliases: CTF1, cardiotrophin 1, CT-1, CT1
- External IDs: OMIM: 600435; MGI: 105115; GeneCards: CTF1

Gene location (Human)
Chr.	Chromosome 16 (human)
Band	16p11.2	Start	30,896,614 bp
Band	16p11.2	End	30,903,547 bp

Gene location (Mouse)
Chr.	Chromosome 7 (mouse)
Band	7|7 F3	Start	127,311,908 bp
Band	7|7 F3	End	127,317,364 bp
RNA expression pattern
Bgee	Human / Mouse (ortholog); Top expressed in: apex of heart; muscle of thigh; body of uterus; popliteal artery; tibial arteries; left ovary; right auricle of heart; right ovary; left ventricle; canal of the cervix / Top expressed in: vestibular membrane of cochlear duct; Epithelium of choroid plexus; retinal pigment epithelium; epithelium of lens; ciliary body; vestibular sensory epithelium; muscle of thigh; choroid plexus of fourth ventricle; internal carotid artery; external carotid artery; More reference expression data
BioGPS	n/a
Gene ontology
Molecular function	cytokine activity; protein binding; leukemia inhibitory factor receptor binding
Cellular component	extracellular space; extracellular region
Biological process	cell-cell signaling; cell surface receptor signaling pathway; muscle organ development; leukemia inhibitory factor signaling pathway; cell population proliferation; neuron development; nervous system development; positive regulation of cell population proliferation; positive regulation of tyrosine phosphorylation of STAT protein; regulation of signaling receptor activity; cytokine-mediated signaling pathway; neuron differentiation
Sources:Amigo / QuickGO
Orthologs
Databases	NCBI: entry; OMA: entry
Species	Human	Mouse
Entrez	1489	13019
Ensembl	ENSG00000150281	ENSMUSG00000042340
UniProt	Q16619	Q60753
RefSeq (mRNA)	NM_001142544; NM_001330	NM_001301282; NM_001301283; NM_007795
RefSeq (protein)	NP_001136016; NP_001321	NP_001288211; NP_001288212; NP_031821
Location (UCSC)	Chr 16: 30.9 – 30.9 Mb	Chr 7: 127.31 – 127.32 Mb
PubMed search
- Wikidata
View/Edit Human	View/Edit Mouse

Cardiotrophin-1 (CT-1) is a protein encoded by the CTF1 gene in humans. It functions as a cytokine and acts as a 21.5 kDa cardiac hypertrophic factor. CT-1 belongs to the IL-6 cytokine family.

== Tissue distribution ==
CT-1 is highly expressed in the heart, skeletal muscle, prostate and ovary and to lower levels in lung, kidney, pancreas, thymus, testis and small intestine.

== Mode of action ==
The protein exerts its cellular effects by interacting with the glycoprotein 130 (gp130)/leukemia inhibitory factor receptor beta (LIFR) heterodimer. In addition, CT-1 activates phosphatidylinositol 3-kinase (PI-3 kinase) in cardiac myocytes and enhances transcription factor NF-κB DNA -binding activities.

== Clinical significance ==
CT-1 is associated with the pathophysiology of heart diseases, including hypertension, myocardial infarction, valvular heart disease, and congestive heart failure.

Exogenous administration of CT-1 in rodents has been found to mimic the beneficial effects of exercise on the heart in a rodent model of severe right-sided heart failure.

CT-1 is under formal development for the treatment of reperfusion injury. It is or was also under development for treatment of acute kidney injury, diabetes mellitus, ischemia, liver failure, and obesity, but no recent development for these indications has been reported.

== See also ==
- Exercise mimetic
