= Lokivetmab =

Monoclonal antibody

Monoclonal antibody
- Type: Whole antibody
- Target: interleukin 31 (IL-31)

Clinical data
- Trade names: Cytopoint
- Routes of administration: subcutaneous injection
- ATCvet code: QD11AH91 (WHO)

Legal status
- Legal status: veterinary use

Identifiers
- CAS Number: 1533403-95-0
- UNII: 3D6091GOHH

Lokivetmab, trade name Cytopoint, is a monoclonal antibody used to treat atopic dermatitis in dogs. It acts against interleukin 31 (IL-31), which is a cytokine involved in causing itchiness (pruritus). Lokivetmab is administered by subcutaneous injection; each dose is effective for four to eight weeks.

The United States Department of Agriculture (USDA) approved lokivetmab (manufactured by Zoetis and sold under the trade name Cytopoint) in December 2016, and it was approved by the European Medicines Agency in 2017. Lokivetmab was the first monoclonal antibody to be approved for use in animals in the European Union.
