= Ziltivekimab =

Antibody against interleukin 6

Monoclonal antibody
- Type: Whole antibody
- Source: Human
- Target: Interleukin 6

Legal status
- Legal status: Investigational

Identifiers
- CAS Number: 2226654-05-1
- PubChem SID: 505900785
- DrugBank: DB18836
- UNII: AN3Y2B4SX4
- KEGG: D12807

Chemical and physical data
- Formula: C_{6468}H_{9976}N_{1716}O_{2014}S_{44}
- Molar mass: 145411.59 g·mol^{−1}

Ziltivekimab is an investigational new drug being developed by Novo Nordisk for the treatment of various inflammatory diseases. It is a fully human monoclonal antibody that targets interleukin 6 (IL-6). Ziltivekimab is being investigated for effect on cardiovascular outcomes in high risk patients such as those post myocardial infarction. In clinical trials, levels of high-sensitivity C-reactive protein were reduced in people taking the drug. The drug has also been tested in chronic kidney disease.

As of May 2025, ziltivekimab remains investigational and has not been approved for clinical use. It is currently being evaluated in ongoing phase 2 and phase 3 clinical trials.

== Clinical trials ==
=== Phase 1/2 trial in hemodialysis patients ===
Patients received placebo or Ziltivekimab (2, 6, or 20 mg) intravenously every two weeks for 12 weeks. The trial assessed safety, pharmacokinetics, and pharmacodynamic endpoints, including inflammatory markers, iron parameters, and erythropoiesis-stimulating agent (ESA) usage.

=== RESCUE trial ===
The trial evaluated changes in hsCRP, hemoglobin levels, iron metabolism biomarkers, and safety outcomes.

=== HERMES and ZEUS trials ===
The ongoing HERMES trial (NCT05636176) is evaluating monthly subcutaneous Ziltivekimab (15 mg) versus placebo in patients with heart failure with preserved or mildly reduced ejection fraction (HFpEF or HFmrEF). The primary endpoints include cardiovascular death, heart failure hospitalization, and urgent visits.

The ZEUS trial (NCT05021835), a phase 3 study, is assessing Ziltivekimab's effects on cardiovascular outcomes—including myocardial infarction and stroke—in patients with established cardiovascular disease, CKD, and hsCRP ≥2 mg/L. The ZEUS trial failed to meet its primary endpoint, showing no clinically significant reduction in major adverse cardiac events (MACE), despite successfully lowering IL-6 and other inflammatory biomarkers. Serious infections were more common in the ziltivekimab group, with overall rates of serious adverse events being comparable across groups.
