= Granulocyte colony-stimulating factor receptor =

Protein found in humans

CSF3R
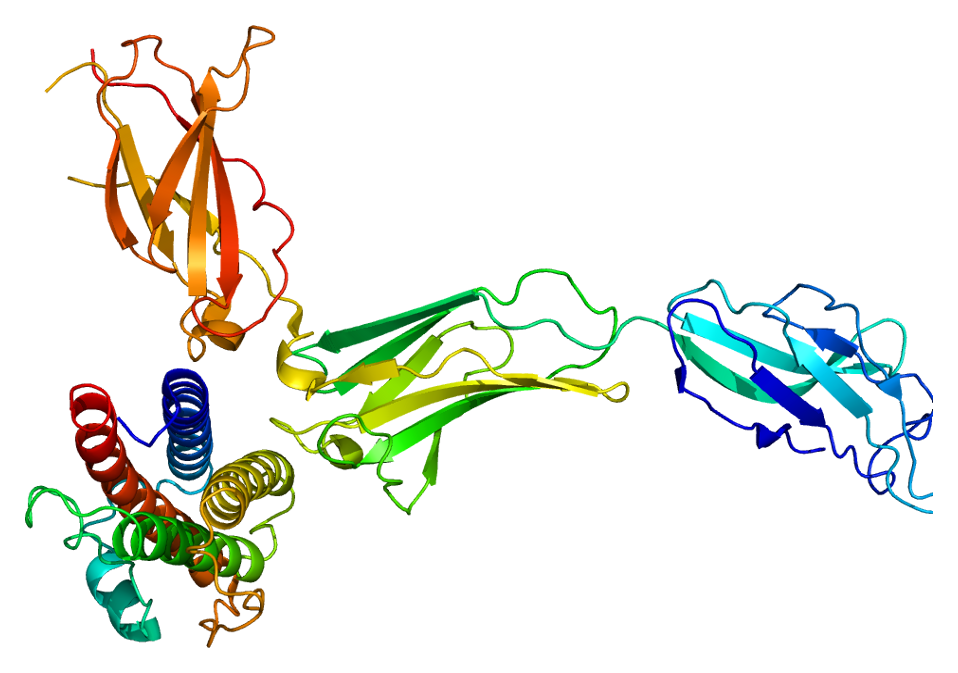

Identifiers
- Aliases: CSF3R, CD114, GCSFR, colony stimulating factor 3 receptor, SCN7
- External IDs: OMIM: 138971; MGI: 1339755; GeneCards: CSF3R
Available structures
PDB	Ortholog search: PDBe RCSB
PDB	List of PDB id codes 2D9Q

Gene location (Human)
Chr.	Chromosome 1 (human)
Band	1p34.3	Start	36,466,043 bp
Band	1p34.3	End	36,483,278 bp

Gene location (Mouse)
Chr.	Chromosome 4 (mouse)
Band	4 D2.2|4 59.77 cM	Start	125,918,343 bp
Band	4 D2.2|4 59.77 cM	End	125,938,233 bp
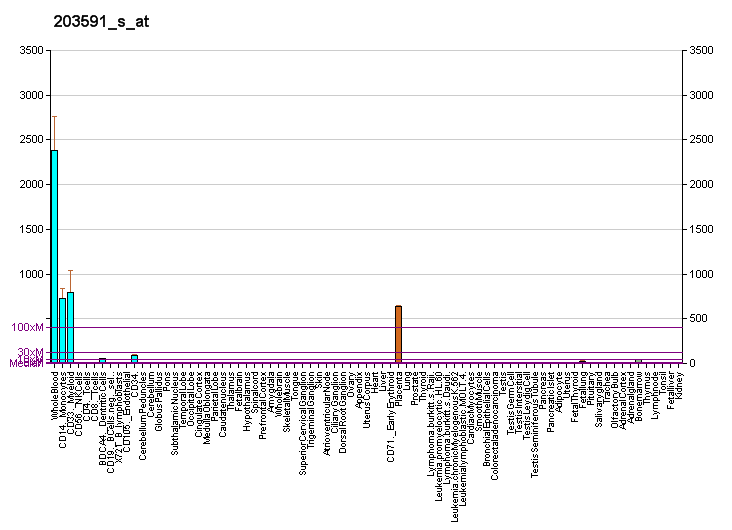
RNA expression pattern
Bgee	Human / Mouse (ortholog); Top expressed in: granulocyte; monocyte; blood; upper lobe of left lung; right lung; spleen; bone marrow cell; placenta; lower lobe of lung; trabecular bone / Top expressed in: granulocyte; tibiofemoral joint; blood; blastocyst; bone marrow; morula; stroma of bone marrow; spleen; mesenteric lymph nodes; right lung; More reference expression data
BioGPS	More reference expression data
Gene ontology
Molecular function	cytokine receptor activity; protein binding; granulocyte colony-stimulating factor binding; signaling receptor activity; interleukin-3 receptor activity; cytokine binding; interleukin-3 binding
Cellular component	integral component of membrane; extracellular region; integral component of plasma membrane; membrane; plasma membrane; external side of plasma membrane; receptor complex
Biological process	defense response; cell adhesion; regulation of myeloid cell differentiation; neutrophil chemotaxis; signal transduction; amelogenesis; cytokine-mediated signaling pathway; cellular response to interleukin-3; interleukin-3-mediated signaling pathway
Sources:Amigo / QuickGO
Orthologs
Databases	NCBI: entry; OMA: entry
Species	Human	Mouse
Entrez	1441	12986
Ensembl	ENSG00000119535	ENSMUSG00000028859
UniProt	Q99062	P40223
RefSeq (mRNA)	NM_000760; NM_156038; NM_156039; NM_172313	NM_001252651; NM_007782
RefSeq (protein)	NP_000751; NP_724781; NP_758519	NP_001239580; NP_031808
Location (UCSC)	Chr 1: 36.47 – 36.48 Mb	Chr 4: 125.92 – 125.94 Mb
PubMed search
- Wikidata
View/Edit Human	View/Edit Mouse

The granulocyte colony-stimulating factor receptor (G-CSF-R) also known as CD114 (Cluster of Differentiation 114) is a protein that in humans is encoded by the CSF3R gene. G-CSF-R is a cell-surface receptor for the granulocyte colony-stimulating factor (G-CSF). The G-CSF receptors belong to a family of cytokine receptors known as the hematopoietin receptor family. The granulocyte colony-stimulating factor receptor is present on precursor cells in the bone marrow, and, in response to stimulation by G-CSF, initiates cell proliferation and differentiation into mature neutrophilic granulocytes and macrophages.

The G-CSF-R is a transmembrane receptor that consists of an extracellular ligand-binding portion, a transmembrane domain, and the cytoplasmic portion that is responsible for signal transduction. GCSF-R ligand-binding is associated with dimerization of the receptor and signal transduction through proteins including Jak, Lyn, STAT, and Erk1/2.

== Isoforms ==
The class IV isoform defective for both internalization and differentiation signaling, and colony-stimulating.

== Clinical significance ==
Mutations in this gene are a cause of Kostmann syndrome, also known as severe congenital neutropenia.

Mutations in the intracellular part of this receptor are also associated with certain types of leukemia.

In clinical medicine, there is a suggestion that use of GCSF should be avoided, at least in children and adolescents and perhaps adults, when G-CSFR isoform IV is overexpressed.

== Interactions ==
Granulocyte colony-stimulating factor receptor has been shown to interact with Grb2, HCK and SHC1.

== See also ==
- Cluster of differentiation
