= Oncostatin M receptor =

Protein-coding gene in the species Homo sapiens

OSMR

Identifiers
- Aliases: OSMR, OSMRB, PLCA1, IL-31R-beta, IL-31RB, oncostatin M receptor, OSMRbeta
- External IDs: OMIM: 601743; MGI: 1330819; GeneCards: OSMR

Gene location (Human)
Chr.	Chromosome 5 (human)
Band	5p13.1	Start	38,845,858 bp
Band	5p13.1	End	38,945,596 bp

Gene location (Mouse)
Chr.	Chromosome 15 (mouse)
Band	15 A1|15 3.3 cM	Start	6,843,058 bp
Band	15 A1|15 3.3 cM	End	6,904,450 bp
RNA expression pattern
Bgee	Human / Mouse (ortholog); Top expressed in: pericardium; saphenous vein; cartilage tissue; tibia; lower lobe of lung; right ventricle; peritoneum; visceral pleura; parietal pleura; superficial temporal artery / Top expressed in: retinal pigment epithelium; transitional epithelium of urinary bladder; conjunctival fornix; stroma of bone marrow; gastrula; lumbar spinal ganglion; endothelial cell of lymphatic vessel; ciliary body; right lung lobe; tunica media of zone of aorta; More reference expression data
BioGPS	n/a
Gene ontology
Molecular function	cytokine receptor activity; oncostatin-M receptor activity; growth factor binding; cytokine binding; protein binding
Cellular component	integral component of membrane; oncostatin-M receptor complex; plasma membrane; apical plasma membrane; membrane; external side of plasma membrane; receptor complex
Biological process	positive regulation of acute inflammatory response; response to cytokine; oncostatin-M-mediated signaling pathway; positive regulation of cell population proliferation; cytokine-mediated signaling pathway
Sources:Amigo / QuickGO
Orthologs
Databases	NCBI: entry; OMA: entry
Species	Human	Mouse
Entrez	9180	18414
Ensembl	ENSG00000145623	ENSMUSG00000022146
UniProt	Q99650	O70458
RefSeq (mRNA)	NM_001168355; NM_003999; NM_001323504; NM_001323505; NM_001323506 NM_001323507	NM_011019; NM_001310469
RefSeq (protein)	NP_001161827; NP_001310433; NP_001310434; NP_001310435; NP_001310436 NP_003990	NP_001297398; NP_035149
Location (UCSC)	Chr 5: 38.85 – 38.95 Mb	Chr 15: 6.84 – 6.9 Mb
PubMed search
- Wikidata
View/Edit Human	View/Edit Mouse

Oncostatin-M specific receptor subunit beta also known as the Oncostatin M receptor (OSMR), is one of the receptor proteins for oncostatin M, that in humans is encoded by the OSMR gene.

OSMR is a member of the type I cytokine receptor family. This protein heterodimerizes with interleukin 6 signal transducer to form the type II oncostatin M receptor and with interleukin 31 receptor A to form the interleukin 31 receptor, and thus transduces oncostatin M and interleukin 31 induced signaling events.

== Expression ==
OSMR is widely expressed across non-haematopoietic, hepatocytes, mesothelial cells, glial cells and epithelial cell types across various organs and mammary glands. OSM receptor is abundantly expressed on endothelial and stromal/fibroblast cells in the lung of mice.=

In vitro expression of OSMR in fetal hepatocytes is upregulated by OSM stimulation.

OSMR expression has been shown to be induced by parathyroid hormone in osteoblasts and OSM.

== Signaling ==
Intracellular cell signalling occurs as a consequence of extracellular binding of the ligand OSM to OSMR complexes, formed from dimerization with receptor subunits such as gp130. Activation of the OSMR-gp130 complex by OSM triggers Janus Kinase 1 (JAK1) and Jak2 cross phosphorylation of tyrosine residues on the intracellular receptor domain. Downstream signaling activation of the OSMR-gp130 complex along the JAK1 pathway leads to IL-6 signalling which is linked with activation of the MAPK cascade, PI3K cascade and STAT3 activation.

OSM induced recruitment of SHC to the OSMRβ sub-unit has been shown to enhance Ras/Raf/MAPK signaling and lead p38 and JNK activation.

== Clinical significance ==
The oncostatin M receptor is associated with primary cutaneous amyloidosis.

OSM signaling via the OSMR is believed to play an important role in bone turnover as Mice lacking the OSMR receptor have osteopetrotic phenotypes. Lack of OSMRβ activity has also been linked to adipose tissue inflammation and insulin resistance preceding obesity.

OSM in-vivo regulation of hematopoiesis, through stimulation of stromal cells & hematopoietic progenitors - megakaryocytic and erythrocytic progenitors, is carried out by the OSMRβ receptor.

=== Heart Disease ===
Inhibition of the OSMRβ extracellular subunit has been shown has been shown to prevent OSM-mediated down-regulation of myoglobin in cardiomyocytes and related apoptosis of cardiomyocytes in inflammatory heart failure.

OSMRβ is not only overexpressed in patients with chronic dilated cardiomyopathy but has been shown to control dedifferentiation and loss of sarcomeric structures in myocardial infarction and dilated cardio myopathy. OSM and OSMRβ mediated dedifferentiation has been shown to increase chances of survival after acute myocardial damage but poor survival rates and compromised pump functions in chronic disease states.

=== Cancer ===
OSMR activates STAT3 and transforming growth factor β (TGF-β) effector SMAD3 to regulate expression of genes responsible for inducing a mesenchymal/CSC phenotype.

OSM-induced biological effects on breast tumor– derived cell lines were specifically mediated through the gp130/OSMRB complex.

the OSM receptor (OSMR) is overexpressed in cervical squamous cell carcinomas and, independent of tumor stage, is associated with adverse clinical outcomes and higher relative risk of death.

OSM and OSMRβ are co-expressed and lead to STAT 3 activation malignant human ovarian epithelial cells.

The OSMR β promoter gene is highly methylated in primary Colorectal Cancer tissues and fecal DNA, it is a highly specific diagnostic biomarker of Colorectal Cancer.
