= Type I cytokine receptor =

Receptors on the surface of cells

Type I cytokine receptor, cytokine-binding domain

Identifiers
- Symbol: TypeI_recpt_CBD
- Pfam: PF09240
- Pfam clan: CL0159
- InterPro: IPR015321
- SCOP2: 1n26 / SCOPe / SUPFAM
- Membranome: 1030
Available protein structures:
- PDB: IPR015321 PF09240 (ECOD; PDBsum)
- AlphaFold: IPR015321; PF09240

Type I cytokine receptors are transmembrane receptors expressed on the surface of cells that recognize and respond to cytokines with four α-helical strands. These receptors are also known under the name hemopoietin receptors, and share a common amino acid motif (WSXWS) in the extracellular portion adjacent to the cell membrane. Members of the type I cytokine receptor family comprise different chains, some of which are involved in ligand/cytokine interaction and others that are involved in signal transduction.

The common cytokine-binding domain is related to the Fibronectin type III domain.

== Signal transduction chains ==
The signal transducing chains are often shared between different receptors within this receptor family.

- The IL-2 receptor common gamma chain (also known as CD132) is shared between:
  - IL-2 receptor
  - IL-4 receptor
  - IL-7 receptor
  - IL-9 receptor
  - IL-13 receptor
  - IL-15 receptor
  - IL-21 receptor
- The common beta chain (CSF2RB, CD131, or CDw131) is shared between the following type I cytokine receptors:
  - GM-CSF receptor
  - IL-3 receptor
  - IL-5 receptor.
- The gp130 receptor (Glycoprotein 130) (also known as gp130, IL6ST, IL6-beta or CD130) is shared between:
  - IL-6 receptor
  - IL-11 receptor
  - IL-12 receptor
  - IL-27 receptor
  - Leukemia inhibitory factor receptor
  - Oncostatin M receptor

== Examples ==
Type I cytokine receptors include interleukin receptors, colony stimulating factor receptors and other cytokine receptors

=== Interleukin receptors ===
- Interleukin-1 receptor
- Interleukin-2 receptor
- Interleukin-3 receptor
- Interleukin-4 receptor
- Interleukin-5 receptor
- Interleukin-6 receptor
- Interleukin-7 receptor
- Interleukin-9 receptor
- Interleukin-11 receptor
- Interleukin-12 receptor
- Interleukin-13 receptor
- Interleukin-15 receptor
- Interleukin-18 receptor
- Interleukin-21 receptor
- Interleukin-23 receptor
- Interleukin-27 receptor

=== Colony stimulating factor receptors ===
- Erythropoietin receptor
- GM-CSF receptor
- G-CSF receptor
- Thrombopoietin receptor

=== Hormone receptor/neuropeptide receptor ===
- Growth hormone receptor
- Prolactin receptor
- Leptin receptor

=== Other ===
- Oncostatin M receptor
- Leukemia inhibitory factor receptor
