= Leukemia inhibitory factor =

Mammalian protein found in Homo sapiens

LIF
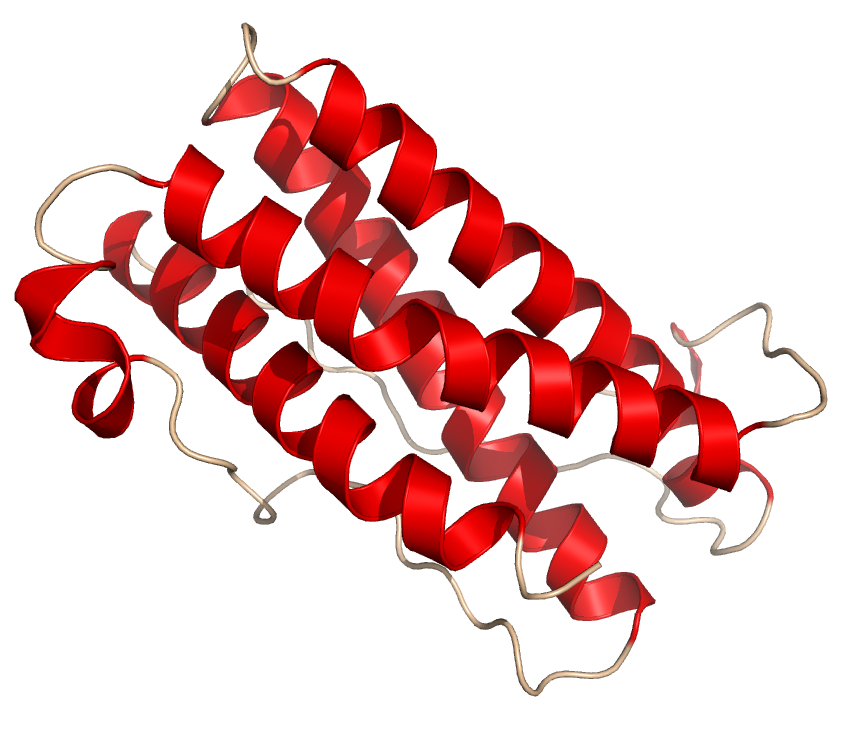

Identifiers
- Aliases: LIF, CDF, DIA, HILDA, MLPLI, leukemia inhibitory factor, interleukin 6 family cytokine, LIF interleukin 6 family cytokine
- External IDs: OMIM: 159540; MGI: 96787; GeneCards: LIF
Available structures
PDB	Ortholog search: PDBe RCSB
PDB	List of PDB id codes 1EMR, 1PVH, 2Q7N

Gene location (Human)
Chr.	Chromosome 22 (human)
Band	22q12.2	Start	30,240,453 bp
Band	22q12.2	End	30,246,759 bp

Gene location (Mouse)
Chr.	Chromosome 11 (mouse)
Band	11 A1|11 2.94 cM	Start	4,207,557 bp
Band	11 A1|11 2.94 cM	End	4,222,514 bp
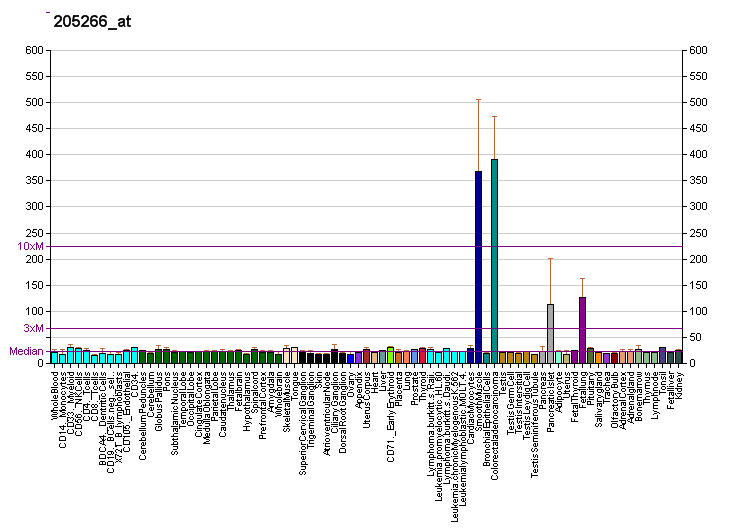
RNA expression pattern
Bgee	Human / Mouse (ortholog); Top expressed in: cartilage tissue; gallbladder; beta cell; vena cava; mucosa of urinary bladder; appendix; pancreatic ductal cell; mucosa of transverse colon; smooth muscle tissue; mucosa of paranasal sinus / Top expressed in: endometrium; Glandular part of endometrium; mucous gland; blastocyst; morula; lip; granulocyte; stroma of bone marrow; yolk sac; esophagus; More reference expression data
BioGPS	More reference expression data
Gene ontology
Molecular function	signaling receptor binding; growth factor activity; cytokine activity; protein binding; leukemia inhibitory factor receptor binding
Cellular component	extracellular region; extracellular space; cytosol
Biological process	negative regulation of cell population proliferation; stem cell differentiation; positive regulation of peptidyl-serine phosphorylation of STAT protein; positive regulation of MAPK cascade; positive regulation of peptidyl-serine phosphorylation; spongiotrophoblast differentiation; lung development; positive regulation of histone H3-K27 acetylation; multicellular organism development; lung lobe morphogenesis; muscle organ morphogenesis; maternal process involved in female pregnancy; negative regulation of hormone secretion; leukemia inhibitory factor signaling pathway; regulation of metanephric nephron tubule epithelial cell differentiation; regulation of cell differentiation; positive regulation of gene expression; stem cell population maintenance; positive regulation of peptidyl-tyrosine phosphorylation; regulation of RNA polymerase II regulatory region sequence-specific DNA binding; positive regulation of astrocyte differentiation; negative regulation of ERK1 and ERK2 cascade; neuron development; decidualization; positive regulation of mesenchymal to epithelial transition involved in metanephros morphogenesis; lung alveolus development; positive regulation of macrophage differentiation; blood vessel remodeling; trophoblast giant cell differentiation; lung vasculature development; positive regulation of transcription by RNA polymerase II; positive regulation of protein localization to nucleus; embryo implantation; negative regulation of meiotic nuclear division; immune response; positive regulation of cell population proliferation; positive regulation of tyrosine phosphorylation of STAT protein; tyrosine phosphorylation of STAT protein; regulation of signaling receptor activity; cytokine-mediated signaling pathway
Sources:Amigo / QuickGO
Orthologs
Databases	NCBI: entry; OMA: entry
Species	Human	Mouse
Entrez	3976	16878
Ensembl	ENSG00000128342	ENSMUSG00000034394
UniProt	P15018	P09056
RefSeq (mRNA)	NM_001257135; NM_002309	NM_001039537; NM_008501
RefSeq (protein)	NP_001244064; NP_002300	NP_001034626; NP_032527
Location (UCSC)	Chr 22: 30.24 – 30.25 Mb	Chr 11: 4.21 – 4.22 Mb
PubMed search
- Wikidata
View/Edit Human	View/Edit Mouse

Leukemia inhibitory factor, or LIF, is an interleukin 6 class cytokine that affects cell growth by inhibiting differentiation. When LIF levels drop, the cells differentiate.

== Function ==
LIF derives its name from its ability to induce the terminal differentiation of myeloid leukemic cells, thus preventing their continued growth. Other properties attributed to the cytokine include: the growth promotion and cell differentiation of different types of target cells, influence on bone metabolism, cachexia, neural development, embryogenesis and inflammation. p53 regulated LIF has been shown to facilitate implantation in the mouse model and possibly in humans. It has been suggested that recombinant human LIF might help to improve the implantation rate in women with unexplained infertility.

== Binding and activation ==
LIF binds to the specific LIF receptor (LIFR-α) which forms a heterodimer with a specific subunit common to all members of that family of receptors, the GP130 signal transducing subunit. This leads to activation of the JAK/STAT (Janus kinase/signal transducer and activator of transcription) and MAPK (mitogen activated protein kinase) cascades.

== Expression ==
LIF is normally expressed in the trophectoderm of the developing embryo, with its receptor LIFR expressed throughout the inner cell mass. As embryonic stem cells are derived from the inner cell mass at the blastocyst stage, removing them from the inner cell mass also removes their source of LIF. Recombinant LIF has been produced in rice Oryza sativa for use in culture of stem cells.

== Use in stem cell culture ==
LIF is often added to stem cell culture media as an alternative to feeder cell culture, due to the limitation that feeder cells present by only producing LIF on their cell surfaces. Feeder cells lacking the LIF gene do not effectively support stem cells. LIF promotes self-renewal by recruiting signal transducer and activator of transcription 3 (Stat3). Stat3 is recruited to the activated LIF receptor and phosphorylated by Janus kinase. It bears noting that LIF and Stat3 are not sufficient to inhibit stem cell differentiation, as cells will differentiate upon removal of serum. During the reversibility phase of differentiation from naive pluripotency, it is possible to revert cells back to naive pluripotency through the addition of LIF. Removal of LIF pushes stem cells toward differentiation, however genetic manipulation of embryonic stem cells allows for LIF independent growth, notably overexpression of the gene Nanog.

LIF is typically added to stem cell culture medium to reduce spontaneous differentiation.
