= IL31RA =

Protein-coding gene in the species Homo sapiens

Identifiers
- Aliases: IL31RA, CRL, CRL3, GLM-R, GLMR, GPL, IL-31RA, PLCA2, PRO21384, hGLM-R, interleukin 31 receptor A, zcytoR17
- External IDs: OMIM: 609510; MGI: 2180511; GeneCards: IL31RA

Gene location (Human)
Chr.	Chromosome 5 (human)
Band	5q11.2	Start	55,851,357 bp
Band	5q11.2	End	55,922,854 bp

Gene location (Mouse)
Chr.	Chromosome 13 (mouse)
Band	13|13 D2.2	Start	112,656,432 bp
Band	13|13 D2.2	End	112,730,894 bp
RNA expression pattern
Bgee	Human / Mouse (ortholog); Top expressed in: testicle; gonad; monocyte; thoracic aorta; ascending aorta; spinal ganglia; Descending thoracic aorta; granulocyte; trigeminal ganglion; tibia / Top expressed in: lumbar spinal ganglion; zygote; secondary oocyte; primary oocyte; seminal vesicula; embryo; spermatid; morula; ventricular zone; Rostral migratory stream; More reference expression data
BioGPS	n/a
Gene ontology
Molecular function	transcription coactivator activity; cytokine receptor activity; protein kinase binding; cytokine binding
Cellular component	membrane; external side of plasma membrane; plasma membrane; synapse; cell junction; integral component of membrane; axon; intracellular anatomical structure; presynaptic membrane; cell projection; receptor complex
Biological process	defense response; receptor signaling pathway via JAK-STAT; transmembrane receptor protein tyrosine kinase signaling pathway; cytokine-mediated signaling pathway; immune system process; defense response to other organism; negative regulation of macrophage activation; negative regulation of apoptotic process; acute inflammatory response to antigenic stimulus; monocyte differentiation; macrophage differentiation; MAPK cascade; positive regulation of transcription, DNA-templated; glandular epithelial cell differentiation; positive regulation of cell population proliferation; T-helper 2 cell cytokine production; homeostatic process; positive regulation of tyrosine phosphorylation of STAT protein
Sources:Amigo / QuickGO
Orthologs
Databases	NCBI: entry; OMA: entry
Species	Human	Mouse
Entrez	133396	218624
Ensembl	ENSG00000164509	ENSMUSG00000050377
UniProt	Q8NI17	Q8K5B1
RefSeq (mRNA)	NM_001242636; NM_001242637; NM_001242638; NM_001242639; NM_001297570 NM_001297572; NM_139017	NM_139299
RefSeq (protein)	NP_001229565; NP_001229566; NP_001229567; NP_001229568; NP_001284499 NP_001284501; NP_620586	NP_647460
Location (UCSC)	Chr 5: 55.85 – 55.92 Mb	Chr 13: 112.66 – 112.73 Mb
PubMed search
- Wikidata
View/Edit Human	View/Edit Mouse

Interleukin-31 receptor A is a protein that in humans is encoded by the IL31RA gene.

IL31RA is related to gp130 (IL6ST; MIM 600694), the common receptor subunit for IL6 (MIM 147620)-type cytokines. Oncostatin M receptor (OSMR; MIM 601743) and IL31RA form the heterodimeric receptor through which IL31 (MIM 609509) signals. Expression of IL31RA and OSMR mRNA is induced in activated monocytes, and both mRNAs are constitutively expressed in epithelial cells (Dillon et al., 2004).[supplied by OMIM]
