= SHC1 =

Protein-coding gene in humans

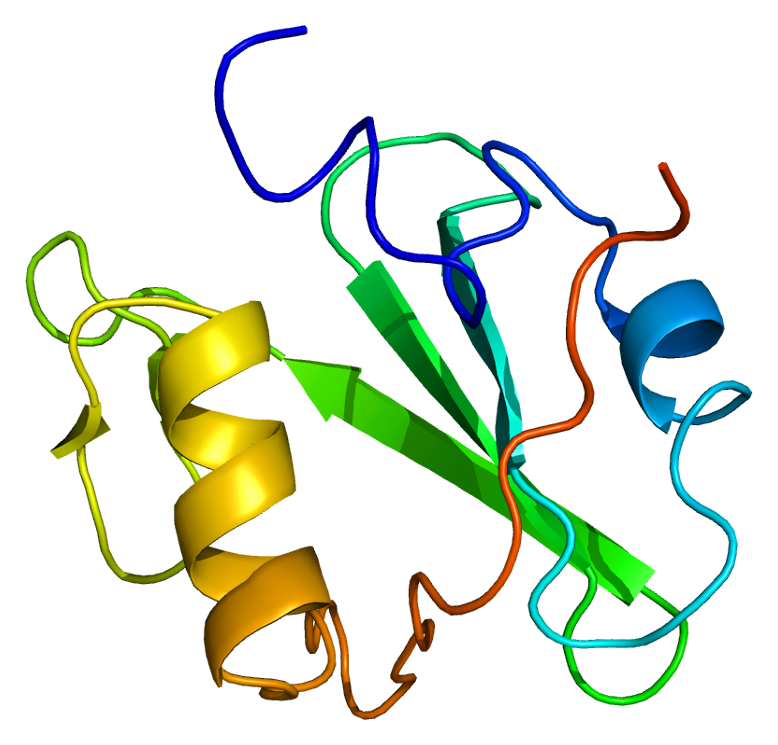

Identifiers
- Aliases: SHC1, SHC, SHCA, SHC adaptor protein 1
- External IDs: OMIM: 600560; MGI: 98296; GeneCards: SHC1
Available structures
| PDB | Ortholog search: PDBe RCSB |
| PDB | List of PDB id codes 1MIL, 1N3H, 1OY2, 1QG1, 1SHC, 1TCE, 2L1C, 4JMH, 4XWX, 5CZI |

Gene location (Human)
| Chr. | Chromosome 1 (human) |
| Band | 1q21.3 | Start | 154,962,298 bp |
| Band | 1q21.3 | End | 154,974,395 bp |

Gene location (Mouse)
| Chr. | Chromosome 3 (mouse) |
| Band | 3 F1|3 39.11 cM | Start | 89,325,750 bp |
| Band | 3 F1|3 39.11 cM | End | 89,337,334 bp |
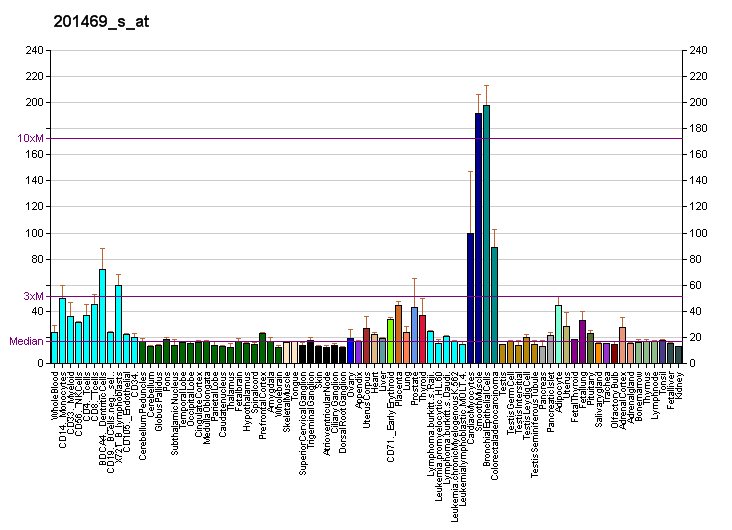

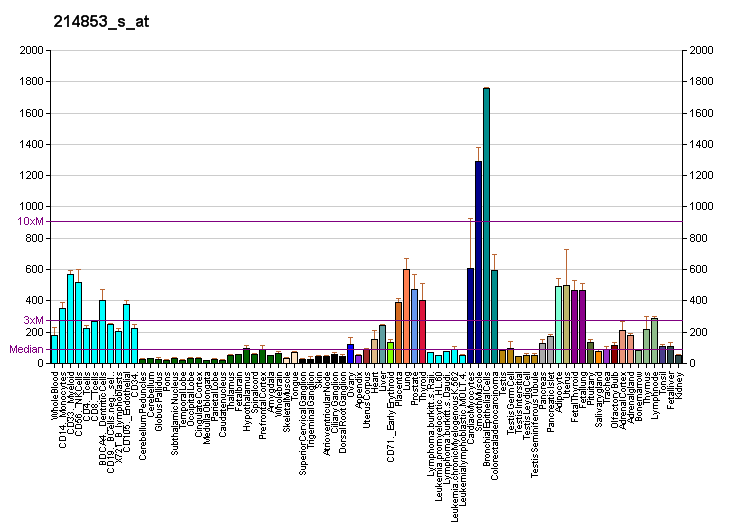
RNA expression pattern
| Bgee | Human / Mouse (ortholog); Top expressed in: stromal cell of endometrium; gallbladder; smooth muscle tissue; Descending thoracic aorta; gastric mucosa; anterior pituitary; left uterine tube; cartilage tissue; right lobe of thyroid gland; canal of the cervix / Top expressed in: lens; tail of embryo; granulocyte; uterus; genital tubercle; lung; yolk sac; islet of Langerhans; epiblast; stomach; More reference expression data |
| BioGPS | More reference expression data |
Gene ontology
| Molecular function | insulin-like growth factor receptor binding; transmembrane receptor protein tyrosine kinase adaptor activity; insulin receptor binding; neurotrophin TRKA receptor binding; ephrin receptor binding; epidermal growth factor receptor binding; receptor tyrosine kinase binding; protein binding; phospholipid binding; epidermal growth factor binding; phosphotyrosine residue binding |
| Cellular component | cytoplasm; cytosol; mitochondrial matrix; mitochondrion; Shc-EGFR complex; plasma membrane |
| Biological process | actin cytoskeleton reorganization; insulin receptor signaling pathway; intracellular signal transduction; epidermal growth factor receptor signaling pathway; cellular response to growth factor stimulus; MAPK cascade; Fc-epsilon receptor signaling pathway; development of the heart; IRE1-mediated unfolded protein response; regulation of cell population proliferation; angiogenesis; regulation of epidermal growth factor-activated receptor activity; regulation of growth; Ras protein signal transduction; viral process; leukocyte migration; signal transduction; ERBB2 signaling pathway; axon guidance; defense response to bacterium; negative regulation of apoptotic process; positive regulation of MAPK cascade; negative regulation of transcription, DNA-templated; positive regulation of transcription, DNA-templated; positive regulation of ERK1 and ERK2 cascade; cell-cell adhesion; interleukin-15-mediated signaling pathway; negative regulation of angiogenesis; cytokine-mediated signaling pathway; interleukin-2-mediated signaling pathway; positive regulation of cell proliferation in bone marrow; regulation of superoxide metabolic process; positive regulation of cell population proliferation; positive regulation of Ras protein signal transduction |
Sources:Amigo / QuickGO
Orthologs
| Databases | NCBI: entry; OMA: entry |
| Species | Human | Mouse |
| Entrez | 6464 | 20416 |
| Ensembl | ENSG00000160691 | ENSMUSG00000042626 |
| UniProt | P29353 | P98083 |
| RefSeq (mRNA) | NM_001130040; NM_001130041; NM_001202859; NM_003029; NM_183001 | NM_001113331; NM_011368 |
| RefSeq (protein) | NP_001123512; NP_001123513; NP_001189788; NP_003020; NP_892113 | NP_001106802; NP_035498 |
| Location (UCSC) | Chr 1: 154.96 – 154.97 Mb | Chr 3: 89.33 – 89.34 Mb |
| PubMed search |
- Wikidata
| View/Edit Human | View/Edit Mouse |

SHC-transforming protein 1 is a protein that in humans is encoded by the SHC1 gene. SHC has been found to be important in the regulation of apoptosis and drug resistance in mammalian cells.

SCOP classifies the 3D structure as belonging to the SH2 domain family.

== Gene and expression ==
The gene SHC1 is located on chromosome 1 and encodes 3 main protein isoforms: p66SHC, p52SHC and p46SHC. These proteins differ in activity and subcellular locations, p66 is the longest and while the p52 and p46 link activated receptor tyrosine kinase to the RAS pathway. The protein SHC1 also acts as a scaffold protein which is used in cell surface receptors. The three proteins that SHC1 codes for have distinctly different molecular weights. All three SHC1 proteins share the same domain arrangement consisting of an N-terminal phosphotyrosine-binding(PTB) domain and a C-terminal Src-homology2(SH2) domain. Both of the domains for the three proteins can bind to tyrosine-phosphorylated proteins but they are different in their phosphopeptide-binding specificities. P66SHC is characterized by having an additional N-terminal CH2 domain.

== Function ==
Overexpression of SHC proteins are associated with cancer mitogenesis, carcinogenesis and metastasis. The SHC and its adaptor proteins transmit signaling of the cell surface receptors such as EGFR, erbV-2 and insulin receptors. p52SHC and p46SHC activate the Ras-ERK pathway. p66SHC inhibits ERK1/2 activity and antagonize mitogenic and survival abilities of T-lymphoma Jurkat cell lines. A rise in p66SHC promotes stress induced apoptosis. p66SHC functionally is also involved in regulating oxidative and stress- induced apoptosis – mediating steroid action through the redox signaling pathway. P52SHC and p66SHC have been found in steroid hormone-regulated cancer and metastasizes.

=== EGFR pathway ===
SHC1 has been found to act in signaling information after epidermal growth factor (EGF) stimulation. Activated tyrosine kinase receptors, on the cell surface, use proteins such as SHC1 that contain phosphotyrosine binding domains. After the EGF stimulation SHC1 binds to groups of proteins that activate survival pathways. This activation is followed by a sub-network of proteins that bind to SHC1 and are involved cytoskeleton reorganization, trafficking and signal termination. PTPN122 then acts as a switch to convert SHC1 to SgK269-mediated pathways that regulate cell invasion and morphogenesis. SHC1 is not a static scaffold protein, a protein that does not move or change over time, it is dynamic as the conformation changes and modifies the EGFR signaling output over time.

=== MCT-1 regulation ===
SHC proteins are differentially regulated by the Multiple Copies in T-cell malignancy(MCT-1). This regulation affects the SHC-Ras-ERK pathway. With MCT-1 reduction the phosphor activation of Ras, MEK and ERk ½ were also reduced, this reduction in ERK also affects cyclin D1. The expression of the SHC proteins (all three) were also dramatically reduced with the reduction of MCT-1 because of this it is thought that MCT-1 acts as an inducer of SHC gene transcription. p66SHC is found to be the protein that is most affected by MCT-1. SHC expression downregulated in tumorigenic processes are identified after MCT-1 depletion. By blocking the MCT-1 activity this could inhibit the SHC signaling cascase and the oncogenicty and tumorigenicity that is regulated by SHC expression.

=== Oxidative stress ===
Oxidative stress occurs when the production of reactive oxygen species (ROS) is greater than their catabolism. ROS production by the mitochondria is regulated by many diverse factors including SHC1. The SHC proteins are regulated by tyrosine phosphorylation and are part of the growth factor and stress-induced ERK activation. There have been findings that suggest a correlation between life span and the oxidative stress response. Selective resistance to oxidative stress and extended life span have been related to p66SHC.

=== Life span ===
There is a link between oxidative stress, life span and p66SHC in mice because of this relationship the SHC gene has been related to longevity and increasing the life span of the mouse. It has been proposed that SHC1 modulates the life span and stress response through the DAF-2 insulin- like receptor of the IIS pathway. The SHC-1 can directly interact with the DAF-2 in vitro.

=== p66SHC metabolism ===
p66SHC operates as a redox enzyme linked to apoptotic cell death. p66SHC has been related to the sirtuin-1 system and has been associated with endothelial damage and repair. This relationships is also related to vascular homeostasis and oxidative stress. p66SHC can be altered by changes in the glucose metabolism and vascular senescence. When protein kinase C is induced by hyperglycemia, p66SHC is induced which then leads to oxidative stress. When the coagulated protease-activated protein C inhibits p66SHC a cytoprotective effect on diabetic nephropathy is placed on the kidneys. When a mutations such as a p66SHC deletion occurs the cardiomyocyte death is reduced and a pool of cardiac stem cells are preserved from oxidative damage – preventing diabetic cardiomyopathy. The deletion of p66SHC also protects from ischemia/reperfusion brain injuries through blunted production of free radicals.

== Clinical significance ==
The signaling activation of SHC is implicated in tumorigenic in cancer cells there is a potential to use SHC as a prognostic marker when targeting cancer treatment. SHC1 interacts with SgK269 which is a member of the Src kinase signaling network that characterized basal breast cancer cells. When SgK269 is overexpressed in mammary epithelial cells it promotes the cell growth and might contribute to the progression of aggressive breast cancers. In prostate and ovarian cancer, increased expression of p66Shc appears to promote cell proliferation. and tumorigenicity, particularly in prostate cancer xenografts This tumorigenic effect is related to its ability to increase redox stress in these cancer cells.
