= Leukemia inhibitory factor receptor =

Polyfunctional cytokine

LIFR

Identifiers
- Aliases: LIFR, CD118, LIF-R, SJS2, STWS, SWS, leukemia inhibitory factor receptor alpha, LIF receptor alpha, LIF receptor subunit alpha
- External IDs: OMIM: 151443; MGI: 96788; GeneCards: LIFR
Available structures
| PDB | Ortholog search: PDBe RCSB |
| PDB | List of PDB id codes 3E0G |

Gene location (Human)
| Chr. | Chromosome 5 (human) |
| Band | 5p13.1 | Start | 38,474,668 bp |
| Band | 5p13.1 | End | 38,608,354 bp |

Gene location (Mouse)
| Chr. | Chromosome 15 (mouse) |
| Band | 15 A1|15 3.46 cM | Start | 7,120,095 bp |
| Band | 15 A1|15 3.46 cM | End | 7,226,970 bp |
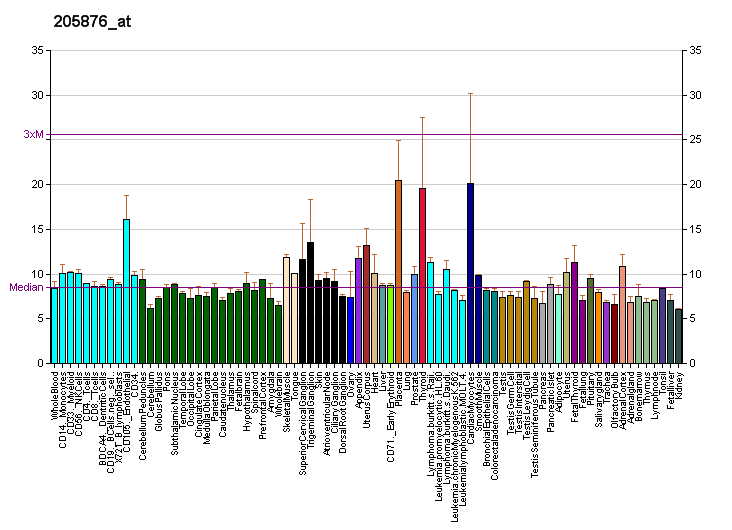
RNA expression pattern
| Bgee | Human / Mouse (ortholog); Top expressed in: internal globus pallidus; external globus pallidus; tibia; Achilles tendon; subthalamic nucleus; pars reticulata; pars compacta; pons; cardia; skin of hip / Top expressed in: body of femur; decidua; sternocleidomastoid muscle; gastrula; parotid gland; stroma of bone marrow; facial motor nucleus; triceps brachii muscle; temporal muscle; trigeminal ganglion; More reference expression data |
| BioGPS | More reference expression data |
Gene ontology
| Molecular function | ciliary neurotrophic factor receptor activity; growth factor binding; oncostatin-M receptor activity; protein binding; cytokine receptor activity; ciliary neurotrophic factor receptor binding; leukemia inhibitory factor receptor activity; cytokine binding |
| Cellular component | integral component of membrane; membrane; plasma membrane; receptor complex; integral component of plasma membrane; extracellular region; extracellular exosome; extracellular space; external side of plasma membrane |
| Biological process | response to cytokine; leukemia inhibitory factor signaling pathway; oncostatin-M-mediated signaling pathway; cytokine-mediated signaling pathway; ciliary neurotrophic factor-mediated signaling pathway; cell surface receptor signaling pathway; positive regulation of cell population proliferation; regulation of cytokine-mediated signaling pathway |
Sources:Amigo / QuickGO
Orthologs
| Databases | NCBI: entry; OMA: entry |
| Species | Human | Mouse |
| Entrez | 3977 | 16880 |
| Ensembl | ENSG00000113594 | ENSMUSG00000054263 |
| UniProt | P42702 | P42703 |
| RefSeq (mRNA) | NM_001127671; NM_002310; NM_001364297; NM_001364298 | NM_001113386; NM_013584; NM_001358593 |
| RefSeq (protein) | NP_001121143; NP_002301; NP_001351226; NP_001351227 | NP_001106857; NP_038612; NP_001345522 |
| Location (UCSC) | Chr 5: 38.47 – 38.61 Mb | Chr 15: 7.12 – 7.23 Mb |
| PubMed search |
- Wikidata
| View/Edit Human | View/Edit Mouse |

LIFR also known as CD118 (Cluster of Differentiation 118), is a subunit of a receptor for leukemia inhibitory factor.

== Function ==
The leukemia inhibitory factor (LIF) is a polyfunctional cytokine that affects the differentiation, survival, and proliferation of a wide variety of cells in the adult and the embryo. LIF action appears to be mediated through a high-affinity receptor complex composed of a low-affinity LIF binding chain (LIF receptor) and a high-affinity converter subunit, glycoprotein 130 (IL6ST, gp130). Both LIFR and gp130 are members of a family of cytokine receptors that includes components of the receptors for the majority of hematopoietic cytokines and for cytokines that affect other systems, including the ciliary neurotrophic factor, growth hormone and prolactin.

== Interactions ==
Leukemia inhibitory factor receptor has been shown to interact with glycoprotein 130.

LIFR has also been identified as a breast cancer metastasis suppressor that functions through the Hippo-YAP pathway. LIFR is down regulated in a number of breast carcinomas and may serve a prognostic tool.

== See also ==
- Cluster of differentiation
