= Janus kinase =

Family of intracellular tyrosine kinases

Janus kinase (JAK) is a family of intracellular, non-receptor tyrosine kinases that transduce cytokine-mediated signals via the JAK-STAT pathway. They were initially named "just another kinase" 1 and 2 (since they were just two of many discoveries in a PCR-based screen of kinases), but were ultimately published as "Janus kinase". The name is taken from the two-faced Roman god of beginnings, endings and duality, Janus, because the JAKs possess two near-identical phosphate-transferring domains. One domain exhibits the kinase activity, while the other negatively regulates the kinase activity of the first.

== Family ==
Overview of signal transduction pathways involved in apoptosis

The four JAK family members are:

- Janus kinase 1 (JAK1)
- Janus kinase 2 (JAK2)
- Janus kinase 3 (JAK3)
- Tyrosine kinase 2 (TYK2)

Transgenic mice that do not express JAK1 have defective responses to some cytokines, such as interferon-gamma. JAK1 and JAK2 are involved in type II interferon (interferon-gamma) signalling, whereas JAK1 and TYK2 are involved in type I interferon signalling. Mice that do not express TYK2 have defective natural killer cell function.

== Functions ==
The JAK-STAT system consists of three main components: (1) a receptor (green), which penetrates the cell membrane; (2) Janus kinase (JAK) (yellow), which is bound to the receptor, and; (3) Signal Transducer and Activator of Transcription (STAT) (blue), which carries the signal into the nucleus and DNA. The red dots are phosphates. After the cytokine binds to the receptor, JAK adds a phosphate to (phosphorylates) the receptor. This attracts the STAT proteins, which are also phosphorylated and bind to each other, forming a pair (dimer). The dimer moves into the nucleus, binds to the DNA, and causes transcription of genes. Enzymes that add phosphate groups are called protein kinases.

Since members of the type I and type II cytokine receptor families possess no catalytic kinase activity, they rely on the JAK family of tyrosine kinases to phosphorylate and activate downstream proteins involved in their signal transduction pathways. The receptors exist as paired polypeptides, thus exhibiting two intracellular signal-transducing domains.

JAKs associate with a proline-rich region in each intracellular domain that is adjacent to the cell membrane and called a box1/box2 region. After the receptor associates with its respective cytokine/ligand, it goes through a conformational change, bringing the two JAKs close enough to phosphorylate each other. The JAK autophosphorylation induces a conformational change within itself, enabling it to transduce the intracellular signal by further phosphorylating and activating transcription factors called STATs (Signal Transducer and Activator of Transcription, or Signal Transduction And Transcription). The activated STATs dissociate from the receptor and form dimers before translocating to the cell nucleus, where they regulate transcription of selected genes.

Some examples of the molecules that use the JAK/STAT signaling pathway are colony-stimulating factor, prolactin, growth hormone, and many cytokines. Janus Kinases have also been reported to have a role in the maintenance of X chromosome inactivation.

=== Clinical significance ===
JAK inhibitors are used for the treatment of atopic dermatitis and rheumatoid arthritis. They are also being studied in psoriasis, polycythemia vera, alopecia, essential thrombocythemia, ulcerative colitis, myeloid metaplasia with myelofibrosis and vitiligo. Examples are tofacitinib, baricitinib, upadacitinib and filgotinib.

In 2014 researchers discovered that tofacitinib, an oral JAK inhibitor, could restore hair growth in some subjects and that applied to the skin, effectively promoted hair growth.

== Structure ==
Domain structure of Janus kinases, JH = JAK homology domain

JAKs range from 120-140 kDa in size and have seven defined regions of homology called Janus homology domains 1 to 7 (JH1-7). JH1 is the kinase domain important for the enzymatic activity of the JAK and contains typical features of a tyrosine kinase such as conserved tyrosines necessary for JAK activation (e.g., Y1038/Y1039 in JAK1, Y1007/Y1008 in JAK2, Y980/Y981 in JAK3, and Y1054/Y1055 in Tyk2). Phosphorylation of these dual tyrosines leads to the conformational changes in the JAK protein to facilitate binding of substrate. JH2 is a pseudokinase domain, a domain structurally similar to a tyrosine kinase and essential for a normal kinase activity, yet lacks enzymatic activity. This domain may be involved in regulating the activity of JH1, and was likely a duplication of the JH1 domain which has undergone mutation post-duplication. The JH3-JH4 domains of JAKs share homology with Src-homology-2 (SH2) domains. The amino terminal (NH_{2}) end (JH4-JH7) of Jaks is called a FERM domain (short for band 4.1, ezrin, radixin and moesin); this domain is also found in the focal adhesion kinase (FAK) family and is involved in association of JAKs with cytokine receptors and/or other kinases.
