= Anti-interleukin-6 =

Drugs to suppress IL-6 signalling

Anti-interleukin-6 agents are a class of therapeutics. Interleukin 6 is a cytokine relevant to many inflammatory diseases and many cancers. Hence, anti-IL6 agents have been sought. In rheumatoid arthritis they can help patients unresponsive to TNF inhibitors.

The first approved medication in this class, tocilizumab (Actemra), is an antibody directed against the IL6-receptor. The second, siltuximab (Sylvant), is directed against IL-6 itself. Siltuximab is approved for treatment of human immunodeficiency virus-negative and HHV-8-negative patients with multicentric Castleman's disease. Siltuximab was also tested in the phase I/II study for therapy of patients with metastatic castration-associated prostate cancer in combination with docetaxel and in renal cell carcinoma; phase II trials in ovarian cancer resulted in 39% of patients showed disease stabilization via IL-6-regulated downregulation of CCL2, CXCL12 and VEGF.

Tocilizumab was first used in large-cell lung carcinoma. In phase I/II trial of tocilizumab in ovarian cancer EGFR pathway upregulation was observed and after inhibition of this pathway by gefitinib tumor growth was decreased both in vitro and in vivo.

Sarilumab was approved by US FDA in 2017 for rheumatoid arthritis.

Several agents are in clinical trials: olokizumab (CDP6038) elsilimomab, clazakizumab (BMS-945429, ALD518), sirukumab (CNTO 136), levilimab (BCD-089), and CPSI-2364 an apparent macrophage-specific inhibitor of the p38 mitogen-activated protein kinase pathway. ALX-0061.

e.g. for rheumatoid arthritis : clazakizumab, olokizumab, sarilumab and sirukumab have all reported encouraging phase 2 results. Sirukumab is in multiple phase 3 trials.

Agents in pre-clinical development include ARGX-109, FE301, and FM101.

== Anti-IL-6 Receptor antibodies: Treatment of Coronavirus-associated pulmonary pathology ==
During the COVID-19 pandemic, antagonistic antibodies against the IL-6 receptors were tested in clinical trials to assess their use in treating or preventing severe pneumonia in critically ill COVID-19 patients. Such antibodies include tocilizumab and sarilumab. Antibodies against IL-6 itself, such as siltuximab, were also investigated. Also: Levilimab.

== Exercise induced IL-6 ==
New research has found IL-6 to be an anti-inflammatory cytokine with multiple beneficial effects when released by contracting muscle as a myokine. IL-6 had previously been classified as a proinflammatory cytokine. Therefore, it was first thought that the exercise-induced IL-6 response was related to muscle damage. However, it has become evident that eccentric exercises are not associated with a larger increase in plasma IL-6 than exercise involving concentric “nondamaging” muscle contractions. This finding demonstrates that muscle damage is not required to provoke an increase in plasma IL-6 during exercise. In fact, eccentric exercise may result in a delayed peak and a much slower decrease of plasma IL-6 during recovery. Anti-IL-6 therapies should therefore take into consideration the (beneficial) anti-inflammatory effects of myokines generally, including the now-established multiple benefits of muscle-derived Interleukin 6.

== IL6 and asthma ==
Obesity is a known risk factor in the development of severe asthma, and work has suggested that IL-6 plays a role in regulating disease severity in obesity-related asthma.

Luteolin reduces IL-6 production in some neurons.
