= Clazakizumab =

Chemical compound

Monoclonal antibody
- Type: Whole antibody
- Source: Humanized
- Target: IL6

Clinical data
- Other names: ALD518, BMS-945429
- Routes of administration: infusion
- ATC code: none

Legal status
- Legal status: investigational

Identifiers
- CAS Number: 1236278-28-6
- ChemSpider: none
- UNII: 4S38Z8RA9O
- KEGG: D10312

Chemical and physical data
- Formula: C_{6426}H_{9972}N_{1724}O_{2032}S_{42}
- Molar mass: 145239.02 g·mol^{−1}

Clazakizumab (formerly ALD518 and BMS-945429), an investigational drug, is an aglycosylated, humanized rabbit monoclonal antibody against interleukin-6. Clazakizumab was developed by Bristol Myers Squib and Alder Biopharmaceuticals. A preliminary randomized, double-blind, placebo-controlled, phase 2 dose-ranging study of clazakizumab in psoriatic arthritis patients, funded by the manufacturer, suggested that clazakizumab may be an effective treatment option for musculoskeletal aspects of psoriatic arthritis; however, the antibody lacked a dose-response effect.

== See also ==
- Tocilizumab (Actemra) an anti-IL-6 receptor mAb
- Anti-IL-6, other anti-interleukin-6 agents
