= C6518H10008N1724O2032S38 =

The molecular formula C_{6518}H_{10008}N_{1724}O_{2032}S_{38} (molar mass: 146250.008 g/mol) may refer to:

- Sifalimumab
- Tabalumab
