= Levilimab =

Anti-IL-6 monoclonal antibody

Monoclonal antibody
- Type: ?

Clinical data
- ATC code: L04AC25 (WHO)

Legal status
- Legal status: Investigational

Identifiers
- CAS Number: 2035008-70-7
- UNII: P7UV3L2H80
- KEGG: D12748

Levilimab is an anti-IL-6 monoclonal antibody initially developed to treat rheumatoid arthritis. In 2020, it was approved as a treatment for COVID-19 in Russia.
