= Alkermes plc =

Irish-domiciled healthcare company

- Type: Public
- Traded as: Nasdaq: ALKS; S&P 600 component
- Industry: Biotechnology
- Founded: 1987; 39 years ago
- Founder: Michael Wall
- Headquarters: Dublin, Ireland
- Key people: Richard Pops (CEO)
- Revenue: ▲US$1.47 billion (2025)
- Operating income: ▲US$241.7 million
- Net income: ▲US$241.7 million (2026)
- Total assets: ▲US$2.4 billion
- Total equity: ▲US$1.8 billion
- Number of employees: 2,100
- Website: www.alkermes.com

Alkermes plc is a fully-integrated biopharmaceutical company that focuses on developing medicines for psychiatric and neurological disorders. The company was founded in 1987 by Michael Wall. In September 2011 Alkermes, Inc. merged with Elan Drug Technologies (EDT), the former drug formulation and manufacturing division of Élan Corporation, plc. The company is headquartered in Dublin, and has an R&D center in Waltham, Massachusetts, and a manufacturing facility in Wilmington, Ohio.

== Products ==
Alkermes has five proprietary commercial drug products approved for the treatment of narcolepsy, schizophrenia, bipolar I disorder, alcohol dependence and opioid dependence. These include sodium oxybate for extendend release oral suspension (Lumryz) olanzapine and samidorphan (Lybalvi), an atypical antipsychotic and opioid modulator combination intended for the treatment of schizophrenia and bipolar I disorder; aripiprazole lauroxil (Aristada), a long-acting injectable for schizophrenia; and naltrexone for extended-release injectable suspension (Vivitrol) for alcohol and opioid dependence.

Other products utilizing Alkermes' proprietary technologies include: diroximel fumarate (Vumerity) for multiple sclerosis, risperidone (microspheres) long-acting injectable (Risperdal Consta) for schizophrenia and bipolar I disorder, paliperidone palmitate (Invega Sustenna, Invega Trinza and Invega Hafyerain in the U.S., Xeplion, Trevicta and Bynnali in Europe) for schizophrenia.

In October 2023, Alkermes announced its first data related to its orexin 2 receptor (OXR2) agonist, alixorexton, previously known as ALKS 2680. Alixorexton is in development for the treatment of narcolepsy and idiopathic hypersomnia.

In November 2023, Alkermes completed the planned separation of its oncology business into a new company, Mural Oncology, which plans to continue to work on the investigational interleukin-2 (IL-2) drug, nemvaleukin alfa.

In May 2024, Alkermes completed the sale of its Athlone, Ireland facility to Novo.

In April 2025, Alkermes announced the initiation of a phase 2 study of alixorexton for the treatment of idiopathic hypersomnia.

In July 2025, Alkermes announced positive topline results from Vibrance-1, a phase 2 study evaluating alixorexton for the treatment of narcolepsy type 1.

In November 2025, Alkermes agreed to acquire sleep disorder drugmaker Avadel Pharmaceuticals for up to $2.37 billion, which includes $21 per share in cash plus $1.50 per share contingent on expanded approval of Lumryz by the end of 2028. This resulted after a bidding war between Alkermes and Danish pharmaceutical company Lundbeck. Alkermes had originally offered up to $2.1 billion, which included $18.50 per share plus the contingent $1.50. The deal closed in the first quarter of 2026.

In February 2026, CEO Richard Pops announced plans to effective August 2026. His planned replacement is Blair Jackson, Alkermes' current Chief Operating Officer.

Alkermes has multiple orexin 2 receptor agonists in development for the potential treatment of fatigue associated with multiple sclerosis and Parkinson's disease as well as attention-deficit hyperactivity disorder.
