= Abetimus =

Chemical compound

Abetimus sodium

Clinical data
- Trade names: Riquent
- ATC code: L04AA22 (WHO)

Identifiers
- CAS Number: 169147-32-4
- PubChem SID: 17397358
- ChemSpider: none
- UNII: F5Y7739G6U
- KEGG: D03204

Chemical and physical data
- Formula: C_{1632}H_{1944}N_{610}Na_{156}O_{970}P_{156}S_{4}
- Molar mass: 54171.35 g·mol^{−1}

Abetimus (trade name Riquent) is an immunosuppressant. It is a synthetic biological called a tolerogen. It is made of four double-stranded oligodeoxyribonucleotides that are attached to a carrier platform and are designed to block specific B-cell anti double stranded DNA antibodies. It may also complex anti dsDNA antibodies together, therefore disabling them. This way abetimus was supposed to help treat systemic lupus erythematosus and specifically lupus nephritis.

It was developed by La Jolla Pharmaceutical, who applied for marketing authorisations in the mid-2000s, but the drug was never marketed in the US or in Europe.
