= Tegomil fumarate =

Medication

Clinical data
- Trade names: Riulvy
- Routes of administration: By mouth
- ATC code: L04AX10 (WHO)

Legal status
- Legal status: EU: Rx-only

Identifiers
- IUPAC name: dimethyl 3,6,9-trioxaundecane-1,11-diyl di((2E)-but-2-enedioate)
- CAS Number: 1817769-42-8
- PubChem CID: 92042830
- ChemSpider: 129308498
- UNII: MXD6KMG2ZP
- KEGG: D13167
- ChEMBL: ChEMBL5314544

Chemical and physical data
- Formula: C_{18}H_{26}O_{11}
- Molar mass: 418.395 g·mol^{−1}
- 3D model (JSmol): Interactive image
- SMILES: COC(=O)/C=C/C(=O)OCCOCCOCCOCCOC(=O)/C=C/C(=O)OC
- InChI: InChI=1S/C18H26O11/c1-23-15(19)3-5-17(21)28-13-11-26-9-7-25-8-10-27-12-14-29-18(22)6-4-16(20)24-2/h3-6H,7-14H2,1-2H3/b5-3+,6-4+; Key:XBRIIHOHDRTZMQ-GGWOSOGESA-N

Tegomil fumarate sold under the brand name Riulvy, is a medication used for the treatment of relapsing remitting multiple sclerosis. It is taken by mouth.

The mechanism of action of tegomil fumarate is not fully understood but it is thought to act via its main active metabolite monomethyl fumarate. This metabolite activates the NRF2 transcriptional pathway, which reduces inflammation and modulates the activity of immune cells, thereby protecting the cells of the central nervous system from damage.

Tegomil fumarate was authorized for medical use in the European Union in July 2025.

== Medical uses ==
Tegomil fumarate is indicated for the treatment of people aged thirteen years of age and older with relapsing remitting multiple sclerosis.

== Society and culture ==
=== Legal status ===
In May 2025, the Committee for Medicinal Products for Human Use of the European Medicines Agency adopted a positive opinion, recommending the granting of a marketing authorization for the medicinal product Riulvy, intended for the treatment of adults and children from 13 years of age with relapsing remitting multiple sclerosis. The applicant for this medicinal product is Neuraxpharm Pharmaceuticals, S.L. Riulvy is a hybrid medicine of Tecfidera, which has been authorized in the EU since January 2014. Riulvy contains a different active substance but acts via the same active metabolite as Tecfidera, monomethyl fumarate. Tegomil fumarate was authorized for medical use in the European Union in July 2025.

=== Names ===
Tegomil fumarate is the international nonproprietary name.
