= Mir-638 microRNA precursor family =

mir-638

Identifiers
- Symbol: mir-638
- Rfam: RF00978
- miRBase family: MIPF0000486

Other data
- RNA type: microRNA
- Domain: Eukaryota;
- PDB structures: PDBe

In molecular biology mir-638 microRNA is a short RNA molecule. MicroRNAs function to regulate the expression levels of other genes by several mechanisms.

== Expression in lupus nephritis ==
miR-638 has been implicated in the pathogenesis of lupus nephritis (LN), with intra-renal expression levels differing between normal and lupus nephritis patients. The degree of difference in expression levels further correlates with the degree of disease severity in each LN patient.

== miR-638 and gastric cancer ==
miR-638 levels are significantly downregulated in gastric cancer cell lines, along with deregulation of 23 other miRNAs. Thus miR-628 is likely to be involved in the development and progression of gastric cancer.

== Further applications ==
miR-638 has additionally been found to be upregulated in the K562 leukaemic cell line.

== See also ==
- MicroRNA
