= Rozanolixizumab =

Monoclonal antibody medication

Monoclonal antibody
- Type: Whole antibody
- Source: Chimeric/humanized hybrid
- Target: Neonatal Fc receptor (FCGRT)

Clinical data
- Trade names: Rystiggo
- Other names: UCB-7665, rozanolixizumab-noli
- AHFS/Drugs.com: Monograph
- MedlinePlus: a623040
- License data: US DailyMed: Rozanolixizumab
- Routes of administration: Subcutaneous
- ATC code: L04AL02 (WHO)

Legal status
- Legal status: AU: S4 (Prescription only); CA: ℞-only; US: ℞-only; EU: Rx-only

Identifiers
- CAS Number: 1584645-37-3
- DrugBank: DB14919
- UNII: P7186074QC
- KEGG: D12182

Chemical and physical data
- Formula: C_{6462}H_{9984}N_{1704}O_{2016}S_{44}
- Molar mass: 145211.51 g·mol^{−1}

Rozanolixizumab, sold under the brand name Rystiggo, is a monoclonal antibody used for the treatment of myasthenia gravis. Rozanolixizumab is a humanized and chimeric monoclonal antibody; and is a neonatal Fc receptor blocker.

The most common adverse reactions include headache, infections, diarrhea, pyrexia, hypersensitivity reactions, and nausea.

Rozanolixizumab was approved for medical use in the United States in June 2023, and in the European Union in January 2024.

== Medical uses ==
Rozanolixizumab is indicated for the treatment of generalized myasthenia gravis in adults who are anti-acetylcholine receptor or anti-muscle-specific tyrosine kinase antibody positive.

== Society and culture ==
=== Legal status ===
In November 2023, the Committee for Medicinal Products for Human Use of the European Medicines Agency adopted a positive opinion, recommending the granting of a marketing authorization for the medicinal product Rystiggo, intended for the treatment of myasthenia gravis. The applicant for this medicinal product is UCB Pharma. Rozanolixizumab was approved for medical use in the European Union in January 2024.

=== Names ===
Rozanolixizumab is the international nonproprietary name.

Rozanolixizumab is sold under the brand name Rystiggo.
