= Avadel Pharmaceuticals =

Specialty pharmaceutical company

Avadel Pharmaceuticals plc
- Type: Public
- Traded as: Nasdaq: AVDL
- Industry: Pharmaceutical industry
- Founded: 1990; 36 years ago in Lyon, France
- Headquarters: Dublin, Ireland
- Key people: Gregory J. Divis (CEO); Thomas S. McHugh (CFO)
- Products: Lumryz
- Services: Sleep disorder treatment
- Revenue: $ 150.2M (Dec31, 2016)
- Owner: Alkermes
- Website: www.avadel.com

Avadel Pharmaceuticals plc was an Irish specialty pharmaceutical company focused on sleep disorder medicines marketed for hospital and primary care treatments. Headquartered in Dublin, Ireland, it had operations in St. Louis, Missouri and Lyon, France. It was a developer of the US FDA-approved anti-narcolepsy medication LUMRYZ (sodium oxybate). It was acquired by Alkermes in February 2026.

== History ==
Founded as Flamel Technologies SA in Lyon, France, in 1990, the company acquired FSC Holdings and its pediatric, therapeutics, and laboratory subsidiaries in 2016. in January 2017, Flamel, Éclat, and FCS Pediatrics became Avadel Pharmaceuticals following a cross-border merger from France to Ireland.

When Craig Stapleton resigned as chairman in 2019, COO Gregory Divis temporarily assumed the role of CEO after Mike Anderson resigned; that same year, Avadel filed for Chapter 11 bankruptcy. In 2023, a year after acquiring Éclat Pharmaceuticals, it received FDA approval for Lumryz, a prolonged-release oral suspension of sodium oxybate.

In 2025, a bidding war ensued between Irish Alkermes plc and Danish Lundbeck over the acquisition of Avadel. In October, Alkerms made an offer for up to $2.1 billion, which included $18.50 per share in cash plus $1.50 per share contingent on expanded approval of Lumryz by the end of 2028.

Lundbeck then offered a competing bid with the same cash per share amount but with up to $2 per share tied to future sales milestones for Lumryz and valiloxybate, an experimental therapy. Alkermes then revised their offer to $21 per share in cash and the contingent $1.50 per share.

When Alkermes' revised $2.37 billion offer was accepted by the drugmaker's board in November, the deal was expected to close in the first quarter of 2026. On February 12, 2026, it was announced that Alkermes had completed the acquisition of Avadel, after which Avadel was delisted.
