= Lundbeck =

Danish pharmaceutical company

H. Lundbeck A/S
- Company type: Aktieselskab
- Traded as: Nasdaq Copenhagen: HLUN A; Nasdaq Copenhagen: HLUN B
- Industry: Pharmaceuticals
- Founded: 14 August 1915; 110 years ago
- Founder: Hans Lundbeck
- Headquarters: Copenhagen, Denmark
- Key people: Charl van Zyl (CEO, president); Joerg Hornstein (CFO)
- Website: lundbeck.com

H. Lundbeck A/S, commonly referred to as Lundbeck, is a Danish international pharmaceutical company engaged in the research, development, manufacturing, marketing and sale of pharmaceuticals across the world. The company’s products are targeted at brain diseases, including depression, schizophrenia, Alzheimer's disease, Parkinson's disease and migraine.

== Company operations ==
Headquartered in Copenhagen, Denmark, Lundbeck has approximately 5,600 employees in more than 50 countries. They have production facilities in Denmark, France and Italy and their research centers are based in Denmark and the US. Their products are registered in more than 100 countries.

Lundbeck is listed on the Copenhagen Stock Exchange (CSE).

Lundbeck is a full member of the European Federation of Pharmaceutical Industries and Associations (EFPIA) and of the International Federation of Pharmaceutical Manufacturers and Associations (IFPMA).

== History ==
The company was founded by Hans Lundbeck in 1915, and was initially a trading company supplying a variety of goods to the Danish market, including machinery for manufacturing, aluminium foil, artificial sweeteners, and photographic equipment.

Lundbeck entered the pharmaceutical market in 1924, importing medicines and cosmetics from companies based in other European and American countries. By the late 1930s, Lundbeck had begun to produce its own medicinal products and had established its own research department. Production continued during the Second World War, although it was limited due to a lack of raw materials.

After the war, Lundbeck continued to grow and in 1957 the company introduced Truxal (chlorprothixene) for the treatment of schizophrenia, entering the market for brain disorders. In 1954, the Lundbeck Foundation was established to maintain and expand the activities of Lundbeck Group and also to provide funding for scientific research of the highest quality. From the late 1970s, and up through the 1980s, Lundbeck diverted its old agency business and thus became a dedicated pharmaceutical company focusing on the production of drugs used to treat disorders and diseases of the central nervous system. In 1989, Lundbeck launched the antidepressant Celexa (citalopram), which became the cornerstone for the company's international expansion and in 2009, Lundbeck, bought Ovation and established a commercial platform in the USA.

In 2012, to focus on newer, strategic CNS-products, Lundbeck sold a portfolio of non-core products to Recordati S.p.A. (Recordati Rare Diseases). In 2014 Lundbeck acquired Chelsea Therapeutics for up to $658 million.

In March 2018, the company acquired Prexton Therapeutics for up to €905 million ($1.1 billion).

In June 2018, the former Millennium Pharmaceuticals CEO, Deborah Dunsire, was named the new CEO of Lundbeck.

In September 2019, Lundbeck announced it would acquire Alder BioPharmaceuticals $18 per share, valuing Alder at almost $2 billion.

In June 2023, Charl van Zyl, head of neurology solutions at UCB, has announced as the next CEO and President to succeed Dunsire.

In October 2024, Lundbeck agreed to acquire American epilepsy drug maker Longboard Pharmaceuticals for $2.6 billion.

In November 2025, Lundbeck lost in a bidding war with Alkermes plc over the acquisition of Irish sleep disorder drugmaker Avadel Pharmaceuticals.

== Controversies ==
Lundbeck formerly held the only license to manufacture pentobarbital (Nembutal) in the United States. The drug is commonly used for execution by lethal injection in the United States (either as part of a three drug cocktail or by itself). After coming under criticism for not adding an ‘end user’ agreement to prevent importers from selling Nembutal to American prisons for use in executions, Lundbeck announced that it would not sell Nembutal to prisons in U.S. states that carry out executions. By introducing a new distribution system, Nembutal will be supplied exclusively through a specialty pharmacy drop ship program that will deny distribution of the product to prisons in U.S. states currently active in carrying out the death penalty by lethal injection. In December 2011, Lundbeck divested a portfolio of products including Nembutal to US pharmaceutical company Akorn Inc. As part of the agreement, Akorn committed to continue with Lundbeck's restricted distribution program for Nembutal, which was implemented to restrict the use of the product in the US. Akorn declared bankruptcy under Chapter 7 in 2023. Since 2012, US prisons have reported a serious shortage of Nembutal.

On June 19, 2013, the European Commission imposed a fine of €93.8 million on Lundbeck and fined several producers of generic pharmaceuticals a total of €52.2 million after Lundbeck made agreements in 2002 with the other companies to delay less expensive generics of Lundbeck's citalopram from entering the market. In return for the ability to maintain a monopoly on the drug's manufacture, Lundbeck offered payments and other kickbacks.

== See also ==
- Tarenflurbil, which the company had arranged for EU distribution rights on prior to termination of its development by Myriad.
