= Paolo Antonio Ascierto =

Italian oncologist, researcher and winemaker

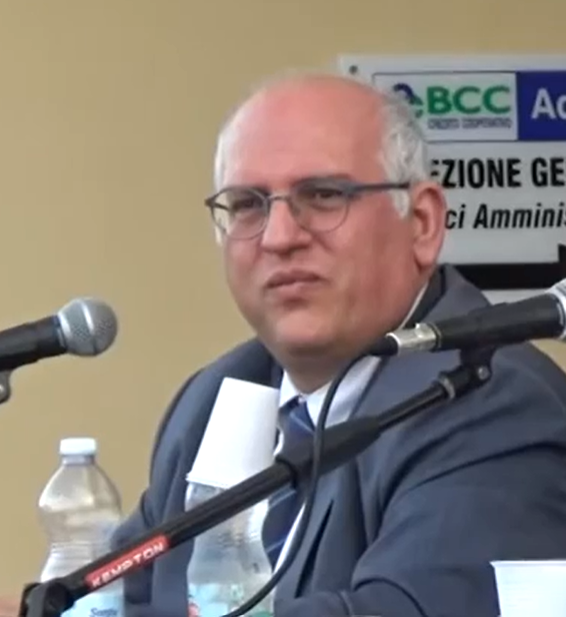
- A screenshot from a video recording of Paolo Antonio Ascierto published by Cilento Channel
- Born: 8 November 1964 (age 61); Solopaca, Italy
- Citizenship: Italian
- Occupations: Oncologist, researcher and winemaker
- Years active: 1990 – present
- Known for: Research on melanoma and immunotherapy
- Spouse: Maria Teresa Melucci
- Honours: Order of Merit of the Italian Republic

Paolo Antonio Ascierto (Solopaca, 8 November 1964) is an Italian oncologist and winemaker. He was once nominated best oncologist in the world for the treatment of melanoma between 2013 and 2023, and he is amongst the best oncologists in Italy as of currently.

== Biography ==
=== Before his career ===
Paolo Antonio Ascierto was born on 8 November 1964 in the town of Solopaca in Campania, Italy. His mother was native to Solopaca, whilst his father was born in Sant'Agata de' Goti. From age 6 he accompanied his brother Filippo Ascierto and his grandparent (who was also named Paolo Ascierto) in the family owned vineyard, developing a passion for wine which would last into adulthood, despite later admitting in interviews that it can cause addiction or even tumors if abused. He drank his first glass of wine when he was 12, in 1976.

His family moved to Campobasso, the capital of Molise, where he spent most of the years of his education, whilst his father focused on his job as a member of the local carabinieri. Initially, a young Paolo Antonio Ascierto, wanted to follow in his father's footsteps and become a carabiniere, but his father opposed the idea, insisting that he should have embraced the field of medicine. When he was younger, Paolo did not like others imposing their ideas on him, and thus he initially wanted to enroll in a university specialized in engineering to later choose the branch specialized in bioengineering, however, after discussing with a professor in Fuorigrotta he decided to study in the field of medicine once and for all.

=== During his medical career ===
==== Before the COVID-19 pandemic ====
Ascierto graduated from the University of Naples Federico II in 1990 in the field of medicine and surgery. He would later specialize in the field of oncology in 1994. His main field of study is the prevention and the cure of cancer, in particular within the fields of melanoma and immunotherapy of tumors. He would move away from Molise in the same year, 1994, where up until then he had worked in his early years with intermediate stays in Campobasso and Campomarino. During this period he developed a habit of smoking, but later stopped. According to the H-Index, he is one of the top researchers in Italy. Starting from 2019, Paolo Ascierto is at the top of the rankings of Expertscape, which recognizes his research and hard work regarding the topic of melanoma.

He is the director of the unit of research in cures against melanoma, oncological immunotherapy, and innovative therapies within the National Institute for the Study and Treatment of Cancer, also known as the "Giovanni Pascale Foundation", and the president of the "Melanoma Foundation" which runs sensitization campaigns and research regarding melanoma.

- 1996-2007: Coordinator of the Melanoma Cooperative Group of Naples
- 2001-2007: Member of the Scientific Committee of the National Cancer Institute of Naples
- 2001-2004: Member of the executive board of the Italian Melanoma Intergroup
- 2003: President of the Interdepartmental Melanoma Unit of the National Cancer Institute of Naples
- 2004-2007: President of the Italian Melanoma Intergroup
- 2006-2010: Member of the International Melanoma Working Group
- 2006-2012: Member of the executive board of the Italian Network for Cancer Biotherapies
- 2007-2009: Member of the Provincial Technical Commission of Benevento for the implementation of the Regional Hospital Plan
- 2007-2008: Member of the National Oncology Commission

From 2004 to 2007, he was the president of the "Melanoma Italiano" intergroup, an NGO created in 1998. He was the main organizer and thinker behind the national campaign known as "KO the Melanoma" (12 February 2006 - 7 April 2007 - 13 April 2008), aimed at supporting the research against melanoma and preventing its causes. The campaign got support from the Lega Nazionale Professionisti and RAI.

Starting from February 2006, he became a member of the "National Commission on cutaneous tumors" by the "Italian League for the battles against tumors." In June 2007, he was nominated as a member of the "International Melanoma Working Group, an international group specializing in the topic. In October 2007, he was honored with a note btry of Health and the national oncological commission.

Between 2008 and 2011, he was the director of the Medical Oncological Unit and Oncological Innovative Therapies within the scope of the National Institute for Tumors in Naples.

Starting from 2010, he was nominated the president and socio founder of the "Melanoma Foundation" also known as ONLUS, which was created in that very same year thanks to the help of national funding.

In 2013 he was the director the Melanoma Unit, Oncological Immunotherapy and Innovative Therapies within the IRCSS National Institution on tumors.

Starting in 2014, he was the president of the Campanian Society on Oncological Immunotherapy, and by 2016, he was on the board of the Society of Melanoma Research (SMR), from 2017 on the board of the Cancer Development Drug Forum (CDDF), and an official member of the board of directors for the Society of Immunotherapy on cancer (SITC).

==== COVID-19 pandemic ====
As early as March 2020, at the height of the pandemic in Italy, Paolo Ascierto researched alongside his colleagues the use of the arthritis drug tocilizumab to treat severe COVID-19 pneumonia, seeing some results. The results were recognized nationally and prompted national calls for treatment protocols surrounding the research. Ascierto was heard in an official hearing at the Italian Chamber of Deputies, presenting data suggesting tocilizumab reduced COVID-19 mortality by approximately 22% in clinical use, underscoring its potential benefit. Paolo was at the center of the development of multicenter evaluations of tocilizumab against COVID-19 pneumonia during the whole year, being essential to it. By the end of the year he was already researching a possible vaccine for COVID-19.

In the same year he congratulated his wife for her patience and cooperation in his role within his family, stating that sometimes she had to substitute him as a father figure for his children due to needs of attention requested by his career and research. He confirmed that by then his sons had completed their education and that they were focusing in the field of music, something that he might be interested exploring with his children after retirement and that he's attending to music lessons for.

In 2021 his research of the usage of tocilizumab against COVID-19 was evaluated by the European Medicines Agency and the European Union, where Ascierto was called to as to support such thesis. Whilst the reports showed that the results were modest or unclear, there were also some pieces of evidence that tocilizumab reduced the chances of needing ventilators in certain patients and the effectiveness of its use is still being investigated as of 2025.

On 14 October 2022 he managed to save the life of a person from a heart attack at a restaurant in Padua.

In 2023 he estimated that he received around 500 daily requests for help from people in need of assistance.

==== After the pandemic ====
He was nominated an official professor of oncology at the University of Naples Federico II in October 2025 after an evaluation by the university of his overall career and influence.

In the same year he warned against the abuse of tanning lamps and noted how cases of melanoma increased significantly that year.

=== Winemaking career ===
In 2022, inspired by the influence of his grandparent, Paolo and his brother decided to dedicate themselves to winemaking, utilising fields owned by his family in both Solopaca and Agata' De' Goti'. The process of vinification of the brother's wine was entrusted to Lorenzo Nifo, an expert on the field according to the two brothers. It had been reported that by 11 January 2026 the Ascierto Winery had produced up to 3,000 wine bottles of Falanghina del Sannio utilising 3 hectars of land. Paolo stated that he is considering fully dedicating himself to wine production after retirement, hoping that his sons will follow suit in helping him in the endeavour. Currently, winemaking is his secondary job. It clears his head from the constant requests for help by people and the hardships of his job.

== Publications ==
=== Scientific publications ===
- Francesco M. Marincola, Paolo A. Ascierto, John M. Kirkwood, Emerging Therapeutics for Melanoma, Future Medicine Ltd, London, 2012, ISBN 978-1-78084-032-1
- Paolo A. Ascierto, David F. Stroncek, Ena Wang, Developments in T Cell Based Cancer Immunotherapies, Springer, 2015, ISBN 978-3-319-21167-1
- Paolo A. Ascierto, The treatment of melanoma, Ed. Minerva Medica, Torino, 2019.
- Paolo A. Ascierto, Principles for next generation anti-cancer immunotherapy, Ed. Minerva Medica, Torino, 2020, ISBN 978-88-5532-029-0
- Paolo A. Ascierto, The treatment of melanoma, Ed. Minerva Medica, Torino, 2021, ISBN 978-88-5532-109-9
- Paolo A. Ascierto, Iwona Lugowska, Ruth Plummer, Melanoma & Other Skin Cancers: Essentials For Clinicians. 2021, European Society for Medical Oncology, 2021.
- Alleanza Contro il Cancro. Basi scientifiche per la definizione di linee-guida in ambito clinico per il Melanoma cutaneo. Febbraio 2012. Alleanza Contro il Cancro – ACC.
- Linee guida dell'oncologia italiana. Melanoma. Associazione Italiana di Oncologia Medica (AIOM) 2012-2013-2014-2015-2016-2017-2018-2019-2020-2021.
- Stefania Gori, Paolo A. Ascierto, Massimo Barberis, Gerardo Botti, Piergiacomo Calzavara-Pinton, Ettore D. Capoluongo, Vanna Chiarion-Sileni, Gabriella Farina, Antonio Marchetti, Daniela Massi, Alessandro M. Minisini, Fabrizio Nicolis, Giuseppe Palmieri, Elisabetta Pennacchioli, Paola Queirolo, Antonio Russo, Vincenzo Russo, Francesco Spagnolo. "Raccomandazioni per la determinazione dello stato mutazionale di BRAF nel Melanoma". Gruppo di lavoro AIOM-SIAPEC, Giugno 2019.
- Rahul Seth, Hans Messersmith, Varinder Kaur, John M. Kirkwood, Ragini Kudchadkar, Jennifer L. McQuade, Anthony Provenzano, Umang Swami, Jeffrey Weber, Hrishna C. Alluri, Sanjiv Agarwala, Paolo A. Ascierto, Michael B. Atkins, Nancy Davis, Marc S. Ernstoff, Mark B. Faries, Jason S. Gold, Samantha Guild, David E. Gyorki, Nikhil I. Khushalani, Michael O. Meyers, Caroline Robert, Mario Santinami, Amikar Sehdev, Vernon K. Sondak, Gilliosa Spurrier, Katy K. Tsai, Alexander van Akkooi, Pauline Funchain. "Systemic Therapy for Melanoma: ASCO Guideline". Journal of Clinical Oncology, 2020 Nov 20;38(33):3947-3970. doi:10.1200/JCO.20.00198 Epub 2020 Mar 31. PMID 32228358.
- Ulrich Keilholz, Paolo A. Ascierto, Reinhard Dummer, Caroline Robert, Paul Lorigan, Alexander C. J. van Akkooi, Ana M. Arance Fernandez, Christian U. Blank, Vanna Chiarion Sileni, Marco Donia, Mark B. Faries, Caroline Gaudy-Marqueste, Helen Gogas, Jean J. Grob, Matthias Guckenberger, John Haanen, Andrew J. Hayes, Christoph Hoeller, Celeste Lebbé, Iwona Lugowska, Mario Mandalà, Ivan Márquez-Rodas, Paul Nathan, Bart Neyns, Roger Olofsson Bagge, Susana Puig, Piotr Rutkowski, Bastian Schilling, Vernon K. Sondak, Hussein A. Tawbi, Alessandro Testori, Olivier Michielin “ESMO consensus conference recommendations on the management of metastatic melanoma: under the auspices of the ESMO Guidelines Committee” Ann Oncol. 2020 Nov;31(11):1435-1448. doi:10.1016/j.annonc.2020.07.004 Epub 2020 Aug 4. PMID 32763453
- Julie R Brahmer, Hamzah Abu-Sbeih, Paolo A. Ascierto, Jill Brufsky, Laura C. Cappelli, Frank B. Cortazar, David E. Gerber, Lamya Hamad, Eric Hansen, Douglas B Johnson, Mario E Lacouture, Gregory A Masters, Jarushka Naidoo, Michele Nanni, Miguel-Angel Perales, Igor Puzanov, Bianca D. Santomasso, Satish P. Shanbhag, Rajeev Sharma, Dimitra Skondra, Jeffrey A. Sosman, Michelle Turner, Marc S. Ernstoff. Society for Immunotherapy of Cancer (SITC)” Clinical practice guideline on immune checkpoint inhibitor-related adverse events.” J Immunother Cancer. 2021 Jun;9(6):e002435. doi:10.1136/jitc-2021-002435 PMID 34172516; PMC 8237720

=== Autobiographies ===
- Paolo A. Ascierto: The hundred days that changed my life, Il Mattino, 2022.

== Awards ==
=== Badges of Honor ===
Knight of the Order of Merit of the Italian Republic - ribbon for ordinary uniform

Knight of the Order of Merit of the Italian Republic
— 2 June 2005

Commander of the Order of Merit of the Italian Republic - ribbon for ordinary uniform

Commander of the Order of Merit of the Italian Republic
— 11 February 2001

Grand Official of the Order of Merit of the Italian Republic - ribbon for ordinary uniform

Grand Official of the Order of Merit of the Italian Republic
— 15 March 2021

=== Honorary citizenships ===
In October 2022 he received an honorary citizenship from the town of Vietri sul Mare for his contribution to public health during the COVID-19 pandemic and his research surrounding a vaccine.

In August 2023 he received yet another honorary citizenship based upon his research during the COVID-19 pandemic by the comune of Aquara, however it also highlighted his role in the fight against melanoma.

In November 2025 the comune of Battipaglia lent him a special honorary citizenship as to award him for his role in the fight against melanoma and his ongoing research in the medical field.

=== Other awards ===
The Informative National Medical Scientific Union awarded Paolo Antonio Ascierto. He was also awarded the "XX Scientific Research Award". In 2003 he received the "NUMEROUNO" award in the field of "health experts" from Switzerland. In 2018 he was awarded the "Italian Health Award" and the nationwide "Person of the year award". In 2020 he wins the prize "Saint George who kills the dragon" of the Cracking Cancer Award and he received an U.S. award known as the "Collaboration Award". In 2021 he received the "National award for the Southern Question" due to his contribution in Caserta's scientific progress. In 2025 he received the "ANGPG" award for his contributions on the field of study surrounding melanomas as well as the "Carla Russo" award in December 2025.

== In pop culture ==
During the COVID-19 pandemic Paolo Ascierto became a nation-wide symbol in the fight against the pandemic. His research of the use of tocilizumab against COVID-19 was considered and reviewed worldwide, giving him global notability. His ideas were also critically challenged and opened national debates regarding his thesis.

The famous street artist Jorit made a painting about Ascierto for his role against the spread of COVID-19. The painting was bought for up to 14,400 euros.

The nativity scene artist Emilio de Ciccio, from Soccavo, made a nativity scene figurine dedicated to him. The figurine is wearing a white coat and holds a pair of scissors which methaporically symbolize their use in order to cut the tubes of sickly people.

In Vomero he was celebrated in a toy store, being portrayed as a superhero.

In 2020 Ascierto was a major part within a video in collaboration with "Gli Squallors" created in order to raise funds in the research against COVID-19. The video quickly became popular.

He participated in a video series about melanoma sponsored by AIM as the central figure of each video.
