= Voclosporin =

Medication

Clinical data
- Trade names: Lupkynis
- Other names: VCS, ISA247, Luveniq
- License data: US DailyMed: Voclosporin
- Routes of administration: By mouth
- ATC code: L04AD03 (WHO)

Legal status
- Legal status: US: ℞-only; EU: Rx-only

Identifiers
- IUPAC name: (3S,6S,9S,12R,15S,18S,21S,24S,30S,33S)-30-Ethyl-33-[(1R,2R,4E)-1-hydroxy-2-methylhepta-4,6-dien-1-yl]-1,4,7,10,12,15,19,25,28-nonamethyl-6,9,18,24-tetrakis(2-methylpropyl)-3,21-di(propan-2-yl)-1,4,7,10,13,16,19,22,25,28,31-undecaazacyclotritriacontane-2,5,8,11,14,17,20,23,26,29,32-undecone
- CAS Number: 515814-01-4
- PubChem CID: 6918486
- DrugBank: DB11693
- ChemSpider: 5293683
- UNII: 2PN063X6B1
- KEGG: D09033
- ECHA InfoCard: 100.357.472

Chemical and physical data
- Formula: C_{63}H_{111}N_{11}O_{12}
- Molar mass: 1214.646 g·mol^{−1}
- 3D model (JSmol): Interactive image
- SMILES: O=C1N(C)[C@H](C(=O)N[C@H](C(=O)N(C)CC(=O)N(C)[C@H](C(=O)N[C@H](C(=O)N(C)[C@H](C(=O)N[C@H](C(=O)N[C@@H](C(=O)N([C@H](C(=O)N(C)[C@H](C(=O)N(C)[C@H]1C(C)C)CC(C)C)CC(C)C)C)C)C)CC(C)C)C(C)C)CC(C)C)CC)[C@H](O)[C@H](C)C\C=C\C=C
- InChI: InChI=1S/C63H111N11O12/c1-25-27-28-29-41(15)53(76)52-57(80)66-44(26-2)59(82)68(18)34-49(75)69(19)45(30-35(3)4)56(79)67-50(39(11)12)62(85)70(20)46(31-36(5)6)55(78)64-42(16)54(77)65-43(17)58(81)71(21)47(32-37(7)8)60(83)72(22)48(33-38(9)10)61(84)73(23)51(40(13)14)63(86)74(52)24/h25,27-28,35-48,50-53,76H,1,26,29-34H2,2-24H3,(H,64,78)(H,65,77)(H,66,80)(H,67,79)/b28-27+/t41-,42+,43-,44+,45+,46+,47+,48+,50+,51+,52+,53-/m1/s1; Key:BICRTLVBTLFLRD-PTWUADNWSA-N

Voclosporin, sold under the brand name Lupkynis, is a calcineurin inhibitor used as an immunosuppressant medication for the treatment of lupus nephritis. It is an analog of ciclosporin that has enhanced action against calcineurin and greater metabolic stability.

It was approved for medical use in the United States in January 2021, and in the European Union in September 2022. The U.S. Food and Drug Administration considers it to be a first-in-class medication.

== Chemistry ==
Chemically, cyclosporine, a frequently prescribed calcineurin inhibitor, is the source of voclosporin. However, structural changes have been made to voclosporin in order to increase its effectiveness, metabolic stability, and safety. Voclosporin and cyclophilin A combine to produce a heterodimeric complex that binds to and inhibits calcineurin, a calcium-dependent phosphatase implicated in cytokine generation and T-cell activation. According to X-ray crystallography, the sidechain modification at amino acid 1 in voclosporin changes how the cyclophilin-voclosporin complex binds to a surface composed of catalytic and regulatory subunits in calcineurin (the "latch region"); this change in binding results in potent inhibition of calcineurin.The major site for voclosporin metabolism is also moved to amino acid 9, where the resultant IM9 metabolite, which is nearly eight times less powerful than voclosporin, accounts for 16.7% of all drug-related exposure. Contrarily, cyclosporine undergoes extensive metabolism to produce a number of metabolites, including AM1 and AM19, the production of which is greater than that of IM9; in transplant patients, AM1 concentrations and total exposure levels are higher than or comparable to those of cyclosporine, and both AM1 and AM19 have been linked to nephropathy (nephrotoxicity). There should be little competitive inhibition of the parent drug by its less active metabolite due to the low metabolite load associated with voclosporin.

== Medical uses ==
Lupus nephritis is a common form of glomerular nephritis occurring in patients with systemic lupus nephritis. Lupus nephritis commonly leads patients to chronic kidney failure and therefore places an emphasis on early intervention for improving treatment outcomes. It is a significant risk factor for morbidity and mortality in systemic lupus erythematosus. The management of lupus nephritis comprises immunosuppressive therapy to lessen inflammation and maintain renal function. Guidelines for managing lupus nephritis are provided by the Kidney Disease Improving Global Outcomes (KDIGO) and the European League Against Rheumatism/European Renal Association-European Dialysis and Transplant Association (EULAR/ERA-EDTA). Both sets of recommendations place a strong emphasis on the necessity of lowering proteinuria, a crucial indicator of long-term renal success, and achieving complete renal response (CRR) as treatment objectives.

Early intervention with voclosporin in combination with kidney response is believed to lead to more positive clinical outcomes for lupus nephritis patients. Thus, voclosporin is used in combination with background immunosuppressive regimen for the treatment of lupus nephritis. Safety has not been established in combination with cyclophosphamide.

Since decreasing proteinuria in the first year of treatment of lupus nephritis is known to be associated with improved long-term outcomes, the available clinical data support the use of voclosporin as first-line therapy in combination with mycophenolate mofetil and low-dose glucocorticosteroid.

== Contraindications ==
Patients who are breastfeeding or plan to breastfeed should not take this medication as it may cause fetal harm. Voclosporin is not recommended in patients with a baseline eGFR less than or equal to 45 ml/min/1.73 m2 unless benefits exceeds risk. Dose should be reduced if the drug is used within this population as well as for patients who are hepatically impaired. Avoid the use of live attenuated vaccines when patients are on this medication. Avoid co-administration of voclosporin and other moderate to strong CYP3A4 inhibitors and if needed then reduce the dose of voclosporin. Dosages of PgP-substrate drugs should be reduced if co-administered with voclosporin.

== Adverse effects ==
Voclosporin has a boxed warning for malignancies and serious infections. Patients taking Voclosporin along with other immunosuppressants have an increased risk for developing malignancies and serious infections that may lead to hospitalization or death. The most common adverse reactions of voclosporin were (>3%), glomerular filtration rate decreased, hypertension, diarrhea, headache, anemia, cough, urinary tract infection, abdominal pain(upper), dyspepsia, alopecia, renal impairment, abdominal pain, mouth ulceration, fatigue. tremor, acute kidney injury, and decreased appetite.

Glomerular filtration rate decrease was the most frequently reported adverse reaction, reported in placebo (11.3 per 100 patient-years), LUPKYNIS 23.7 mg (37.1 per 100 patient-years), and voclosporin 39.5 mg BID (48.7 per 100 patient-years). With LUPKYNIS 23.7 mg BID, decreases in glomerular filtration rate occurred within the first 3 months in 71% of patients, with 78% of those resolved or improved following dose modification, and of those 64% resolved or improved within 1 month. Decreases in glomerular filtration rate resulted in permanent discontinuation of LUPKYNIS in 14% of patients and resolved in 40% within 3 months after treatment discontinuation.

== Pharmacology ==
Voclosporin is a cyclosporin A analog, similar to cyclosporin A with modifications on an amino acid within one region that allows the drug to bind to Calcineurin. Voclosporin inhibits calcineurin, which then blocks the production of IL-2 and T-cell mediated immune responses. As a result of the calcineurin inhibition, podocytes (cells within the kidneys) are stabilized while inflammation is reduced. Reduction of inflammation within the kidneys prevents further renal damage.

Calcineurin inhibitors in lupus nephritis have two separate impacts on calcineurin activity: immunomodulatory effects on T-cells and stabilization of the podocyte. Inhibition of calcineurin in T cells prevents nuclear factor of activated T cells (NFAT) from moving to the nucleus, which reduces the transcription of genes encoding inflammatory cytokines. This decreases lymphocyte proliferation and T-cell mediated responses. By preventing the dephosphorylation of synaptopodin in the podocyte, calcineurin inhibition preserves the cytoskeleton's stabilizing function and lowers proteinuria. Up to 1 mg/kg, voclosporin inhibits calcineurin in a dose-dependent manner with little to no lag time from the time reaching the maximum drug concentration to the time reaching maximum calcineurin inhibition. Voclosporin has been demonstrated to be a strong inhibitor of numerous immunological processes, such as lymphocyte proliferation, T-cell cytokine generation, and T-cell surface antigen expression, in in-vitro tests utilizing blood from nonhuman primates. Voclosporin similarly suppressed a variety of T-cell activities in non-human primates in vivo. In these nonclinical investigations, voclosporin was more effective than cyclosporine.,

== Pharmacokinetics and metabolism ==
When administered on an empty stomach, the median Tmax of voclosporin is 1.5 hours. The AUC is estimated to be 7693 ng/mL and the Cmax is estimated at 955 ng/mL. The volume of distribution is approximately 2,154 L and distributes within the red blood cells. The distribution between the plasma and whole blood is affected by temperature and concentration. The protein binding of voclosporin is 97%. The average terminal half-life of voclosporin is 63.6 L/h. The drug is mainly metabolized by the CYP3A4 hepatic cytochrome enzyme. Pharmacologic activity is mainly attributed to the parent molecule itself, with the major metabolite being 8-fold less potent than the parent drug. Exposure is increased in individuals with severe renal impairment (creatinine clearance [CrCL] <30 mL/min) and in those with mild or moderate hepatic impairment. population pharmacokinetic analysis in patients with lupus nephritis showed voclosporin to have predictable pharmacokinetics, with no clinically meaningful influence of sex, body weight, age, serum albumin, total bilirubin or eGFR (>45 mL/min/1.73 m2; patients with eGFR ≤45 mL/min/1.73 m2 were excluded from voclosporin clinical trials). Dose adjustment is not required based on these covariates.

== Safety ==
Since lupus nephritis is a serious, disabling, and possibly life-threatening illness, it is not surprising to see mortality in lupus nephritis clinical trials. Voclosporin safety information originates from a total of 267 patients who received 23.7 mg BID and an additional 88 patients who received 39.5 mg BID. The majority of adverse event categories were more prevalent in voclosporin-treated patients than in placebo-treated patients. Although similar to earlier lupus nephritis trials, the mortality rate (4.9%) was higher in the low-dose voclosporin group; it was noted that the majority of the deaths took place at a small number of locations, and that more patients were randomized to low-dose voclosporin at these locations. A total of 19 patients (3.0%) died across the three published clinical trials with voclosporin in a total of 631 patients with lupus nephritis, all of which had a treatment duration of about a year. This included any deaths that occurred after randomization up to study conclusion. Overall, patients receiving any dose of voclosporin, including 23.7 mg BID and 39.5 mg BID, and patients receiving placebo (6 of 266 patients, 2.3%) experienced a similar rate of death (13 of 365 patients, 3.6%).

== Dosage ==
Up to 64 mg twice daily (BID), according to pharmacokinetic-pharmacodynamic modeling, a significant association was found between voclosporin blood levels and estimated calcineurin inhibition. Based on an integrated safety examination of voclosporin in healthy individuals and patients with various diseases (psoriasis, uveitis, and renal transplant) at doses of 0.2-0.6 mg/kg BID, the therapeutic dose utilized in lupus nephritis was chosen. Weight-based dosing was not required in this dosage range, as shown by the linear pharmacokinetic profile, and there was a dose-dependent rise in the frequency and severity of side events.

== History ==
Voclosporin was discovered by Isotechnika in the 1990s. Isotechnika was founded in 1993 and merged with Aurinia Pharmaceuticals in 2013. Huizinga led the clinical development program for voclosporin before and after the acquisition—including a shift in the synthesis from one that yielded racemates to one that yields a single trans isomer. Voclosporin is the first oral treatment for lupus nephritis to receive approval in the USA. In January 2021, Aurinia Pharmaceuticals received approval from the Food & Drug Administration to sell the drug Lupkynis.

== Society and culture ==
=== Legal status ===
On 21 July 2022, the Committee for Medicinal Products for Human Use (CHMP) of the European Medicines Agency (EMA) adopted a positive opinion, recommending the granting of a marketing authorization for the medicinal product Lupkynis, intended for the treatment of lupus nephritis. The applicant for this medicinal product is Otsuka Pharmaceutical Netherlands B.V. Voclosporin was approved for medical use in the European Union in September 2022.
