= Afelimomab =

Monoclonal antibody

Monoclonal antibody
- Type: F(ab')_{2} fragment
- Source: Mouse
- Target: TNFα

Clinical data
- ATC code: L04AB03 (WHO)

Identifiers
- CAS Number: 156227-98-4
- ChemSpider: none
- UNII: 6SC756X51V
- KEGG: D07436

Afelimomab (MAK 195F) is an anti-TNFα monoclonal antibody. Administration of afelimomab reduces the concentration of interleukin-6 in patients with sepsis, but reduces mortality only marginally.
