= Darvadstrocel =

Medicine

Clinical data
- Trade names: Alofisel
- Other names: CX-601
- Routes of administration: Injection
- ATC code: L04AX08 (WHO)

Legal status
- Legal status: UK: POM (Prescription only); EU: Rx-only; JP: Rx-only

Identifiers
- DrugBank: DB16581
- UNII: 31W7R94KYT
- KEGG: D11397

Darvadstrocel, sold under the brand name Alofisel, is a medication used to treat complex perianal fistulas in adults with non-active/mildly active luminal Crohn's disease when fistulas have shown an inadequate response to at least one conventional or biologic therapy. It contains mesenchymal stem cells from fat tissue of adult donors.

It was approved for use in the European Union in March 2018. The approval was spearheaded by data published in the ADMIRE-CD trial. Darvadstrocel was withdrawn from the EU market in December 2024.

It was approved for use in Japan by Japan's Ministry of Health, Labour and Welfare (MHLW) in September 2021. In January 2026, the marketing of Alofisel in Japan was discontinued.

== Medical use ==
Darvadstrocel was approved by the European Union for the treatment of adults with complex Crohn's perianal fistulas after conventional or biological medications have not worked.

== Mechanism of action ==
Darvadstrocel works by reducing inflammation and facilitating the growth of tissue in the fistula tract.

== History ==
=== ADMIRE-CD ===
The ADMIRE-CD trial was a phase III trial that assessed the safety and efficacy of darvadstrocel vs. placebo in adults with complex perianal fistulas with Crohn's disease. The study randomized a total of 212 patients. 107 patients were given darvadstrocel and 105 patients were given placebo.

After one year, the study found darvadstrocel to be effective in closing external fistula openings, compared to placebo. Patients taking darvadstrocel had a combined remission of 56.3% and clinical remission of 59.2%. The placebo controls had a combined remission of 38.6% and clinical remission of 41.6%.

=== INSPECT ===
Published in 2022, the INSPECT study is a retrospective study that evaluated the long-term effectiveness and safety of darvadstrocel in patients with perianal fistulas in Crohn's disease that were treated in the ADMIRE-CD trial. The study data showed that darvadstrocel or the maintenance treatment used can have long term clinical remission in patients.

=== ADMIRE-CD II ===
ADMIRE-CD II was an international, randomized double-blind placebo-controlled trial of the efficacy and safety of Alofisel (darvadstrocel) in treating complex perianal fistulas in 568 patients with Crohn's disease in whom immunosuppressive agents or biologics had failed. The primary outcome (rate of combined remission at 24 weeks) was similar between treatments (48.8% darvadstrocel vs 46.3% placebo), as were all secondary outcomes. In December 2024, the European Medicines Agency withdrew the marketing authorization for Alofisel (darvadstrocel) upon request of Takeda Pharma.

== Society and culture ==
=== Legal status ===
In 2023, darvadstrocel was approved for medical use in Israel, Switzerland, Serbia, the United Kingdom, and Japan. Darvadstrocel was withdrawn from the European Union market in December 2024. In January 2026, Takeda Pharma discontinued sales of Alofisel in Japan.
