= Mesangial proliferative glomerulonephritis =

- Renal corpuscle showing intraglomerular mesangium, where mesangial proliferation occurs.
- Specialty: Nephrology

Mesangial proliferative glomerulonephritis (MesPGN) is a morphological pattern characterized by a numerical increase in mesangial cells and expansion of the extracellular matrix within the mesangium of the glomerulus. The increase in the number of mesangial cells can be diffuse or local and immunoglobulin or complement deposition can also occur. MesPGN is associated with a variety of disease processes affecting the glomerulus, though can be idiopathic. The clinical presentation of MesPGN usually consists of hematuria or nephrotic syndrome. Treatment is often consistent with the histologic pattern of and disease process contributing to mesangial proliferative glomerulonephritis, and usually involves some form of immunosuppressant.

== Mechanism ==
MesPGN often occurs as a result of glomerular injury, though can be idiopathic. MesPGN has been associated with disease processes such as: IgA nephropathy, IgM nephropathy, systemic lupus erythematous, Alport syndrome, resolving post-infectious glomerulonephritis, and complement nephropathy, such as C1Q nephropathy.

IgA nephropathy is the most common cause of MesPGN. It is thought abnormally glycosylated IgA form polymers and deposit in the mesangium. Subsequently, IgA immune complexes bind to IgA receptors on mesangial cells and induce injury to mesangial cells through release of cytokines and growth factors that promote infiltration of leukocytes, mesangial cell proliferation, and mesangial matrix expansion.

In the context of resolving post-infectious glomerulonephritis, MesPGN can be seen after an infection with a nephritogenic strain of group A streptococci. Pathogenesis of post-streptococcal glomerulonephritis includes injury to the glomerulus by immune complexes (IgG) passively trapped in the glomerulus, which leads to an inflammatory response from recruited immune cells, cytokines, chemical mediators, and complement and coagulation cascade activation. The inflammatory response includes endothelial and mesangial cell proliferation.

Mesangial proliferative glomerulonephritis of lupus nephritis, Class II is also noted by mesangial hypercellularity and matrix expansion. Microscopic hematuria with or without proteinuria may be seen in Class II lupus nephritis. Hypertension, nephrotic syndrome, and acute kidney injury are very rare at this stage.

Idiopathic mesangial proliferative glomerulonephritis is less established in the literature. Idiopathic mesangial proliferative glomerulonephritis does not involve the deposition of either IgA or IgG immune complexes, though there can be focal or diffuse IgM deposits in the mesangium. The relationship of IgM and mesangial proliferative glomerulonephritis is hypothesized to involve either formed or deposited IgM complexes in the mesangium leading to T-cell mediated inflammatory response, mesangial proliferation, and glomerular injury or, as a result of mesangial proliferation, decreased clearance of monocytic IgM complexes.

== Diagnosis ==
Most glomerulonephritis' classification and prognosis are aided by histological evaluation by renal biopsy. The renal biopsy is classically evaluated with light microscopy, electron microscopy, and immunohistology to diagnose a histological pattern, which is then compared to clinical evaluation through history, physical, and laboratory evaluation. The laboratory evaluation usually follows that of a standard nephrology work up and will likely be targeted to a differential diagnosis. Studies focusing on mesangial proliferative glomerulonephritis often use defined clinical criteria and histological criteria to select patients for research. For example, one study used the following histological criteria: "Glomeruli with mesangial hypercellularity (four or more cells/mesangium with or without mesangial matrix expansion and immune complex deposits)". The histologic pattern of injury can also provide insight into the prognosis of the glomerular disorder. Mesangial proliferation indicates a mild, though active, lesion. Overall, a kidney biopsy should address the following:

- Primary diagnosis, with clinical modifiers
- Pattern of injury
- Established score/class/grade of disease entities (i.e., lupus nephritis, IgA nephropathy)
- Secondary diagnosis (i.e., ATN, interstitial nephritis, thrombotic microangiopathy)
- Ancillary studies, if done (i.e., IgG sub typing)
- Chronicity grade and score

The kidney biopsy is foundational to informing the diagnosis of mesangial proliferative glomerulonephritis, as it is a morphological pattern.

== Clinical presentation ==
Mesangial proliferative glomerulonephritis often presents with hematuria (gross or microscopic) or nephrotic syndrome. Presentation can also include asymptomatic proteinuria. These presenting symptoms are relatively non-specific and are often seen in other glomerular disorders. Preceding upper respiratory tract infection or post-streptococcal glomerulonephritis may contribute to hematuria, as both have been identified in patients presenting with hematuria in the context of mesangial proliferative glomerulonephritis. Preceding infection was not as readily identified in patients presenting with either asymptomatic proteinuria or nephrotic syndrome. However, it has been shown patients presenting with nephrotic syndrome have some histo- and clinic-pathologic similarities to minimal change disease.

== Treatment ==
Treatment for glomerular disorders is often established for specific histological patterns. Presentations of hematuria in the context of mesangial proliferative glomerulonephritis often resolve spontaneously, with a relatively benign course. Presentation of nephrotic syndrome in the context of mesangial proliferative glomerulonephritis have been treated with immunosuppressants, such as steroids and cyclophosphamide. Presentation with nephrotic syndrome can resolve with treatment, but can also progress. Patients can become resistant to steroids or specific immunosuppressive agents, in which case it may be necessary to use different immunosuppressive agents.
