= Anifrolumab =

Monoclonal antibody

Monoclonal antibody
- Type: Whole antibody
- Source: Human
- Target: Interferon α/β receptor

Clinical data
- Trade names: Saphnelo
- Other names: MEDI-546, anifrolumab-fnia
- AHFS/Drugs.com: Monograph
- License data: US DailyMed: Anifrolumab
- Pregnancy category: AU: C
- Routes of administration: Intravenous
- Drug class: type I interferon receptor antagonist (IFN)
- ATC code: L04AG11 (WHO)

Legal status
- Legal status: AU: S4 (Prescription only); CA: ℞-only / Schedule D; US: ℞-only; EU: Rx-only

Identifiers
- CAS Number: 1326232-46-5
- DrugBank: DB11976
- ChemSpider: none
- UNII: 38RL9AE51Q
- KEGG: D11082

Chemical and physical data
- Formula: C_{6444}H_{9964}N_{1712}O_{2018}S_{44}
- Molar mass: 145119.20 g·mol^{−1}

Anifrolumab, sold under the brand name Saphnelo, is a monoclonal antibody used for the treatment of systemic lupus erythematosus. It binds to the type I interferon receptor, blocking the activity of type I interferons such as interferon-α and interferon-β.

Anifrolumab was approved for medical use in the United States in July 2021, and in the European Union in February 2022. The U.S. Food and Drug Administration considers it to be a first-in-class medication.

== Mechanism of Action ==
In systemic lupus erythematosus, the body can produce a great amount of type 1 interferon, which activates the immune system excessively and creates problems for lupus patients. Anifrolumab acts to block IFN-1 from sending signals to other immune cells, which prevents the body from being attacked by itself.

== Adverse effects ==
The most common adverse effect was shingles, which occurred in 5% of patients in the low-dose group, to 10% in the high-dose group, and to 2% in the placebo group. Overall adverse effect rates were comparable in all groups.

== History ==
The drug was developed by MedImmune, a unit of AstraZeneca, which chose to move anifrolumab instead of sifalimumab into phase III trials for lupus in 2015.

== Society and culture ==
=== Legal status ===
On 16 December 2021, the Committee for Medicinal Products for Human Use (CHMP) of the European Medicines Agency (EMA) adopted a positive opinion, recommending the granting of a marketing authorization for the medicinal product Saphnelo, intended for the treatment of moderate to severe systemic lupus erythematosus. The applicant for this medicinal product is AstraZeneca AB. Anifrolumab was approved for medical use in the European Union in February 2022.

=== Names ===
Anifrolumab is the international nonproprietary name (INN).
