= Pozelimab =

Medication

Monoclonal antibody
- Type: Whole antibody
- Source: Human
- Target: Complement C5

Clinical data
- Trade names: Veopoz
- Other names: REGN-3918, pozelimab-bbfg
- AHFS/Drugs.com: Monograph
- MedlinePlus: a623055
- License data: US DailyMed: Pozelimab
- Routes of administration: Intravenous, subcutaneous
- ATC code: L04AJ11 (WHO)

Legal status
- Legal status: US: ℞-only

Identifiers
- CAS Number: 2096328-94-6
- DrugBank: DB15218
- UNII: 0JJ21K6L2I
- KEGG: D11477

Chemical and physical data
- Formula: C_{6418}H_{9898}N_{1690}O_{2026}S_{42}
- Molar mass: 144496.11 g·mol^{−1}

Pozelimab, sold under the brand name Veopoz, is a recombinant monoclonal antibody used for the treatment of CD55-deficient protein-losing enteropathy, also known as CHAPLE disease. Pozelimab is a complement inhibitor. It is produced using recombinant DNA technology in Chinese hamster ovary cells.

The most common adverse reactions include upper respiratory tract infections, fractures, hives, and alopecia.

Pozelimab was approved for medical use in the United States in August 2023. It is the first FDA-approved treatment for CHAPLE disease. The US Food and Drug Administration (FDA) considers it to be a first-in-class medication.

== Medical uses ==
Pozelimab is indicated for the treatment of people with CD55-deficient protein-losing enteropathy, also known as CHAPLE disease.

CHAPLE—which stands for complement hyperactivation, angiopathic thrombosis, and protein-losing enteropathy—is an inherited immune disease that causes the complement system (the part of your immune system that defends the body against injury and foreign invaders like bacteria and viruses) to become overactive. It is caused by mutations of the complement regulator CD55 gene, which can lead to the complement system attacking the body's own cells. CHAPLE disease is a rare disease, with fewer than 100 participants diagnosed worldwide. Symptoms can include abdominal pain, nausea, vomiting, diarrhea, loss of appetite, weight loss, impaired growth, and edema (swelling). Severe thrombotic vascular occlusions (blockage of blood vessels) can also occur among participants with CHAPLE disease, which can be life-threatening.

== Adverse effects ==
The US prescribing label for pozelimab has a boxed warning for serious meningococcal infections.

The most common adverse reactions (in 2 or more patients) are upper respiratory tract infection, fracture, urticaria, and alopecia.

== History ==
The efficacy and safety of pozelimab was evaluated in a single-arm study (NCT04209634), in which participants' outcomes were compared to pre-treatment data in participants with active CD55-deficient protein-losing enteropathy who had hypoalbuminemia. Participants' diagnoses were based on a clinical history of protein-losing enteropathy symptoms and with a confirmed genotype of biallelic CD55 loss-of-function mutation. Active CD55-deficient protein-losing enteropathy was defined as hypoalbuminemia (serum albumin concentration of ≤3.2 g/dL) with one or more of the following signs or symptoms within the last six months: diarrhea, abdominal pain, peripheral edema, or facial edema.

The U.S. Food and Drug Administration (FDA) granted the application for pozelimab fast track, orphan drug, and rare pediatric disease designations.

== Society and culture ==
=== Legal status ===
Pozelimab was approved for medical use in the United States in August 2023. The FDA granted the application for pozelimab fast track, priority review, and orphan drug designations.

=== Names ===
Pozelimab is the international nonproprietary name.
