= Vilobelimab =

Medication

Monoclonal antibody
- Type: Whole antibody
- Source: Chimeric
- Target: Complement component 5a (C5a)

Clinical data
- Trade names: Gohibic
- Other names: IFX-1
- AHFS/Drugs.com: Monograph
- License data: US DailyMed: Vilobelimab
- Routes of administration: Intravenous
- ATC code: L04AJ10 (WHO)

Legal status
- Legal status: US: ℞-only via emergency use authorization (EUA); EU: Rx-only

Identifiers
- CAS Number: 2250440-41-4
- DrugBank: DB16416
- UNII: F5T0RF9ZJA
- KEGG: D11838

Chemical and physical data
- Formula: C_{6456}H_{9976}N_{1716}O_{2054}S_{44}
- Molar mass: 145907.42 g·mol^{−1}

Vilobelimab, sold under the brand name Gohibic, is a monoclonal antibody that is used for the treatment of COVID-19. It is a human-mouse chimeric IgG4 kappa antibody that targets human C5a in plasma.

The most common adverse reactions include pneumonia, sepsis, delirium, pulmonary embolism, hypertension, pneumothorax, deep vein thrombosis, herpes simplex, enterococcal infection, bronchopulmonary aspergillosis, hepatic enzyme increased, urinary tract infection, hypoxia, thrombocytopenia, pneumomediastinum, respiratory tract infection, supraventricular tachycardia, constipation, and rash.

Vilobelimab is a recombinant chimeric monoclonal IgG4 antibody that specifically binds to the soluble human complement split product C5a after cleavage from C5 to block its interaction with the C5a receptor, both of which are components of the complement system thought to contribute to inflammation and worsening of COVID-19. Vilobelimab was granted an emergency use authorization (EUA) by the US Food and Drug Administration (FDA) in April 2023. Vilobelimab was authorized for medical use in the European Union in January 2025.

== Medical uses ==
In the US, vilobelimab is authorized via an emergency use authorization for use in hospitalized adults when initiated within 48 hours of receiving invasive mechanical ventilation or extracorporeal membrane oxygenation (artificial life support). Vilobelimab is not approved by the US Food and Drug Administration (FDA) for any indication, including for the treatment of COVID-19.

In the EU, vilobelimab is indicated for the treatment of adults with SARS-CoV-2 induced acute respiratory distress syndrome who are receiving systemic corticosteroids as part of standard of care and receiving invasive mechanical ventilation (with or without extracorporeal membrane oxygenation).

== History ==
The clinical trial supporting the authorization showed that participants treated with vilobelimab had a lower risk of death by day 28 and day 60 of treatment compared to placebo.

== Society and culture ==
=== Legal status ===
In November 2024, the Committee for Medicinal Products for Human Use of the European Medicines Agency adopted a positive opinion, recommending the granting of a marketing authorization under exceptional circumstances for the medicinal product Gohibic intended for the treatment of adults with SARS‑CoV2‑induced acute respiratory distress syndrome (ARDS) who are receiving systemic corticosteroids. The applicant for this medicinal product is InflaRx GmbH. Vilobelimab was authorized for medical use in the European Union in January 2025.

=== Names ===
Vilobelimab is the international nonproprietary name.
