= Focal proliferative nephritis =

- Other names: Focal mesangial proliferative glomerulonephritis
- Specialty: Nephrology

Focal proliferative nephritis is a type of glomerulonephritis seen in 20% to 35% of cases of lupus nephritis, classified as type III. As the name suggests, lesions are seen in less than half of the glomeruli. Typically, one or two foci within an otherwise normal glomerulus show swelling and proliferation of endothelial and mesangial cells, infiltration by neutrophils, and/or fibrinoid deposits with capillary thrombi. Focal glomerulonephritis is usually associated with only mild microscopic hematuria and proteinuria; a transition to a more diffuse form of renal involvement is associated with more severe disease.

== Epidemiology ==
In cases of IgA nephropathy, focal proliferative glomerulonephritis is observed in about 20–50% of renal biopsy specimens. Twenty to sixty percent of patients with lupus who underwent renal biopsies exhibit focal proliferative or mesangial lupus nephritis.

== See also ==
- Lupus nephritis
- Diffuse proliferative nephritis
