= Elsilimomab =

Monoclonal antibody

Monoclonal antibody
- Type: Whole antibody
- Source: Mouse
- Target: IL-6

Clinical data
- ATC code: none

Identifiers
- CAS Number: 468715-71-1
- ChemSpider: none
- UNII: DGK38A42AE

Elsilimomab (also known as B-E8) is a mouse monoclonal antibody. B-E8 was developed by Diaclone, a French company which produces many mouse monoclonal antibodies.

It (OPR-003) targets (and blocks) Interleukin-6.

It has undergone a number of early stage clinical trials, e.g. for lymphoma and myeloma.

It was used as a template to develop a high-affinity, antagonist, fully human anti-IL-6 mAb 1339.
