= Tabalumab =

Monoclonal antibody

Monoclonal antibody
- Type: Whole antibody
- Source: Human
- Target: BAFF

Clinical data
- ATC code: none

Identifiers
- CAS Number: 1143503-67-6
- ChemSpider: none
- UNII: PQP8VH3MJW
- KEGG: D10083

Chemical and physical data
- Formula: C_{6518}H_{10008}N_{1724}O_{2032}S_{38}
- Molar mass: 146252.08 g·mol^{−1}

Tabalumab (LY 2127399) is an anti-B-cell activating factor (BAFF) human monoclonal antibody designed for the treatment of autoimmune diseases and B cell malignancies. Tabalumab was developed by Eli Lilly and Company.

A phase III clinical trial for rheumatoid arthritis was halted in Feb 2013. In September 2014, a second phase III trial focussing on treating systemic lupus erythematosus, was terminated early as the study failed to meet its primary endpoint.

Now dropped by Lilly due to lack of efficacy.
