= ATC code L04 =

Pharmaceutical drug classification

ATC code L04 Immunosuppressants is a therapeutic subgroup of the Anatomical Therapeutic Chemical Classification System, a system of alphanumeric codes developed by the World Health Organization (WHO) for the classification of drugs and other medical products. Subgroup L04 is part of the anatomical group L Antineoplastic and immunomodulating agents.

Codes for veterinary use (ATCvet codes) can be created by placing the letter Q in front of the human ATC code: for example, QL04.
National versions of the ATC classification may include additional codes not present in this list, which follows the WHO version.

== L04A Immunosuppressants ==
=== L04AA Selective immunosuppressants ===
L04AA03 Antilymphocyte immunoglobulin (horse)
L04AA04 Antithymocyte immunoglobulin (rabbit)
L04AA06 Mycophenolic acid
L04AA15 Alefacept
L04AA19 Gusperimus
L04AA22 Abetimus
L04AA24 Abatacept
L04AA28 Belatacept
L04AA32 Apremilast
L04AA40 Cladribine
L04AA41 Imlifidase
L04AA48 Belumosudil
L04AA60 Remibrutinib
L04AA61 Nerandomilast
L04AA62 Tolebrutinib

=== L04AB Tumor necrosis factor alpha (TNF-α) inhibitors ===
L04AB01 Etanercept
L04AB02 Infliximab
L04AB03 Afelimomab
L04AB04 Adalimumab
L04AB05 Certolizumab pegol
L04AB06 Golimumab
L04AB07 Opinercept

=== L04AC Interleukin inhibitors ===
L04AC01 Daclizumab
L04AC02 Basiliximab
L04AC03 Anakinra
L04AC04 Rilonacept
L04AC05 Ustekinumab
L04AC07 Tocilizumab
L04AC08 Canakinumab
L04AC09 Briakinumab
L04AC10 Secukinumab
L04AC11 Siltuximab
L04AC12 Brodalumab
L04AC13 Ixekizumab
L04AC14 Sarilumab
L04AC15 Sirukumab
L04AC16 Guselkumab
L04AC17 Tildrakizumab
L04AC18 Risankizumab
L04AC19 Satralizumab
L04AC20 Netakimab
L04AC21 Bimekizumab
L04AC22 Spesolimab
L04AC23 Olokizumab
L04AC26 Goflikicept
L04AC27 Cendakimab

=== L04AD Calcineurin inhibitors ===
L04AD01 Ciclosporin
L04AD02 Tacrolimus
L04AD03 Voclosporin

=== L04AE Sphingosine 1-phosphate (S1P) receptor modulators ===
L04AE01 Fingolimod
L04AE02 Ozanimod
L04AE03 Siponimod
L04AE04 Ponesimod
L04AE05 Etrasimod

=== L04AF Janus-associated kinase (JAK) inhibitors ===
L04AF01 Tofacitinib
L04AF02 Baricitinib
L04AF03 Upadacitinib
L04AF04 Filgotinib
L04AF05 Itacitinib
L04AF06 Peficitinib
L04AF07 Deucravacitinib
L04AF08 Ritlecitinib
L04AF09 Deuruxolitinib

=== L04AG Monoclonal antibodies ===
L04AG01 Muromonab-CD3
L04AG02 Efalizumab
L04AG03 Natalizumab
L04AG04 Belimumab
L04AG05 Vedolizumab
L04AG06 Alemtuzumab
L04AG07 Begelomab
L04AG08 Ocrelizumab
L04AG09 Emapalumab
L04AG10 Inebilizumab
L04AG11 Anifrolumab
L04AG12 Ofatumumab
L04AG13 Teprotumumab
L04AG14 Ublituximab
L04AG15 Divozilimab
L04AG17 Seniprutug
L04AG18 Sibeprenlimab
L04AG19 Axatilimab

=== L04AH Mammalian target of rapamycin (mTOR) kinase inhibitors ===
L04AH01 Sirolimus
L04AH02 Everolimus

=== L04AJ Complement inhibitors ===
L04AJ01 Eculizumab
L04AJ02 Ravulizumab
L04AJ03 Pegcetacoplan
L04AJ04 Sutimlimab
L04AJ05 Avacopan
L04AJ06 Zilucoplan
L04AJ07 Crovalimab
L04AJ08 Iptacopan
L04AJ09 Danicopan
L04AJ10 Vilobelimab
L04AJ11 Pozelimab

=== L04AK Dihydroorotate dehydrogenase (DHODH) inhibitors ===
L04AK01 Leflunomide
L04AK02 Teriflunomide

=== L04AL Neonatal fragment crystallizable receptor (FcRn) inhibitors ===
L04AL01 Efgartigimod alfa
L04AL02 Rozanolixizumab
L04AL03 Nipocalimab

=== L04AX Other immunosuppressants ===
L04AX01 Azathioprine
L04AX02 Thalidomide
L04AX03 Methotrexate
L04AX04 Lenalidomide
L04AX05 Pirfenidone
L04AX06 Pomalidomide
L04AX07 Dimethyl fumarate
L04AX08 Darvadstrocel
L04AX09 Diroximel fumarate
L04AX10 Tegomil fumarate
L04AX11 Monomethyl fumarate
