= FM101 =

Selective adenosine A3 receptor modulator

FM101 is a selective adenosine A3 receptor modulator developed for various indications, including glaucoma and non-alcoholic fatty liver disease.
