= Olokizumab =

Monoclonal antibody

Monoclonal antibody
- Type: Whole antibody
- Source: Humanized (from rat)
- Target: Interleukin 6

Clinical data
- Trade names: Artlegia
- Routes of administration: Subcutaneous
- ATC code: L04AC23 (WHO)

Legal status
- Legal status: RU: OTC

Pharmacokinetic data
- Elimination half-life: 31 days

Identifiers
- CAS Number: 1007223-17-7
- DrugBank: DB13127
- ChemSpider: none
- UNII: PAI71R1D2W
- KEGG: D12487
- ChEMBL: ChEMBL1743050

Chemical and physical data
- Molar mass: 146000 Da

Olokizumab (OKZ), sold under the name Artlegia, is an immunosuppressive drug, used for the treatment of rheumatoid arthritis and COVID-19. It is a humanized monoclonal antibody against the interleukin-6 (IL-6). IL-6 is a cytokine that plays an important role in immune response and is implicated in the pathogenesis of many diseases. Olokizumab is the first interleukin-6 (IL-6) inhibitor approved for treatment of rheumatoid arthritis which blocks directly cytokine instead of its receptor. Olokizumab specifically binds to IL-6 at Site 3, blocking IL-6 ability to form hexameric complex. Olokizumab was developed by R-Pharm group, and was launched in 2020.

== Medical uses ==
=== Rheumatoid arthritis ===
Olokizumab was approved for medical use in Russia, Kazakhstan, Belarus, Kirgizstan and Azerbaijan under the brand name Artlegia for treatment of patients aged 18 years or older with moderate to severe rheumatoid arthritis in combination with methotrexate who have an inadequate response to methotrexate or tumor necrosis factor inhibitor (TNFi) therapy.

=== COVID-19 ===
Olokizumab was approved for pathogenesis-based therapy of cytokine release syndrome in patients with moderate to severe new coronavirus infection (COVID-19) was approved in Russia, Kirgizstan and Azerbaijan.

== Contraindications ==
- A history of hypersensitivity to olokizumab or any component of the drug.
- Active infectious diseases (including tuberculosis).
- Children under 18 years of age.
- Hereditary fructose intolerance (the drug contains sorbitol).
- Breastfeeding

== Drug interactions ==
In all clinical trials in patients with rheumatoid arthritis, olokizumab was used in conjunction with methotrexate. Special clinical studies of drug interactions of olokizumab have not been conducted. Concomitant use with methotrexate did not affect the olokizumab exposure. The effect of olokizumab on the methotrexate exposure is not expected with their simultaneous use. According to the results of the CREDO1–3 clinical trials, no cases of clinically significant drug interactions of olokizumab with other drugs were reported. In an in vitro study on human cryopreserved hepatocytes, olokizumab reversed the inhibitory effect of IL-6 on CYP1A1/2, 2B6, 2C9, 3A4/5 and 2C19 activity, as well as on NTCP activity. Thus, it should be considered that in patients with active rheumatoid arthritis, dose adjustment of drugs metabolized by these CYP isoforms may be necessary after beginning the treatment with olokizumab.

The concentration of the following drugs may decrease when used together with olokizumab (including, but not limited to): statins (simvastatin, lovastatin, atorvastatin); oral contraceptives; calcium channel blockers; glucocorticoids (dexamethasone, methylprednisolone); warfarin; quinidine; theophylline; tizanidine; phenytoin; pimozide; cyclosporine; sirolimus; tacrolimus; benzodiazepines (e.g., diazepam, alprazolam, triazolam, midazolam, bromazepam).

== History ==
Olokizumab efficacy and safety were studied as part of a large-scale program of clinical trials, CREDO, which included 2,444 adult patients with rheumatoid arthritis from 19 countries worldwide. The study of olokizumab continues in the general, open-label, long-term extension.

CREDO 1. Phase III Study of the Efficacy and Safety of Olokizumab in Subjects With Moderately to Severely Active Rheumatoid Arthritis Inadequately Controlled by Methotrexate Therapy.

CREDO 2. Phase III Study of the Efficacy and Safety of Olokizumab in Subjects With Moderately to Severely Active Rheumatoid Arthritis Inadequately Controlled by Methotrexate Therapy.

CREDO 3. Phase III Study of the Efficacy and Safety of Olokizumab in Subjects With Moderately to Severely Active Rheumatoid Arthritis Inadequately Controlled by Tumor Necrosis Factor Alpha (TNF-α) Inhibitor Therapy.

CREDO 4. Phase III Study of the Efficacy and Safety of Olokizumab in Subjects With Moderately to Severely Active Rheumatoid Arthritis.
