= Diroximel fumarate =

Medication

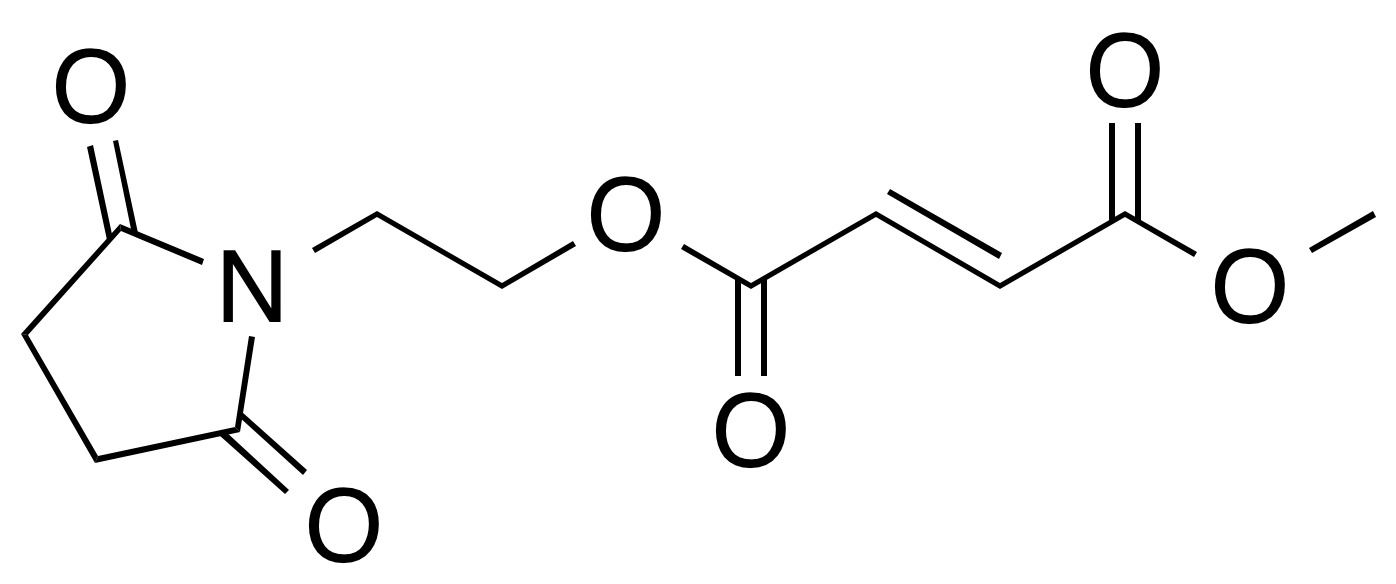

Clinical data
- Trade names: Vumerity
- Other names: ALKS-8700
- AHFS/Drugs.com: Monograph
- MedlinePlus: a620002
- License data: US DailyMed: Diroximel fumarate
- Pregnancy category: AU: B3
- Routes of administration: By mouth
- ATC code: L04AX09 (WHO)

Legal status
- Legal status: AU: S4 (Prescription only); US: ℞-only; EU: Rx-only

Pharmacokinetic data
- Protein binding: Monomethyl fumarate (MMF): 27–45%
- Metabolism: Esterases, citric acid cycle
- Metabolites: MMF (active), hydroxyethyl succinimide (HES, inactive), CO_{2} (inactive)
- Elimination half-life: 1 hour
- Excretion: MMF: 60% lung, 15.5% urine (?), 0.9% faeces HES: 58–63% urine

Identifiers
- IUPAC name: methyl 2-(2,5-dioxopyrrolidin-1-yl)ethyl (2E)-but-2-enedioate
- CAS Number: 1577222-14-0
- PubChem CID: 73330464
- DrugBank: DB14783
- ChemSpider: 57423290
- UNII: K0N0Z40J3W
- KEGG: D11154
- ChEMBL: ChEMBL3989944
- CompTox Dashboard (EPA): DTXSID101026181

Chemical and physical data
- Formula: C_{11}H_{13}NO_{6}
- Molar mass: 255.226 g·mol^{−1}
- 3D model (JSmol): Interactive image
- SMILES: COC(=O)C=CC(=O)OCCN1C(=O)CCC1=O
- InChI: InChI=1S/C11H13NO6/c1-17-10(15)4-5-11(16)18-7-6-12-8(13)2-3-9(12)14/h4-5H,2-3,6-7H2,1H3/b5-4+; Key:YIMYDTCOUQIDMT-SNAWJCMRSA-N

Diroximel fumarate, sold under the brand name Vumerity, is a medication used for the treatment of relapsing forms of multiple sclerosis (MS). It acts as an immunosuppressant and anti-inflammatory drug. Its most common adverse effects are flushing and gastrointestinal problems.

Diroximel fumarate was approved for medical use in the United States in October 2019, and in the European Union in November 2021.

== Medical uses ==
Diroximel fumarate is used for the treatment of relapsing-remitting multiple sclerosis. In the US, it is additionally approved for other relapsing forms of MS such as clinically isolated syndrome and active secondary progressive disease.

=== Available forms ===
The drug is available as a white delayed-release capsule that is resistant to gastric acid and only dissolves in the intestine.

== Contraindications ==
Under the European Union's label, the drug is contraindicated in people with progressive multifocal leukoencephalopathy (PML), a disease of the brain caused by a virus. In the US, combination with the closely related drug dimethyl fumarate is contraindicated.

== Side effects ==
No systematic studies of adverse effects under diroximel fumarate are available. The most common side effects in studies with dimethyl fumarate were flushing (in 34% of patients treated with the drug, versus 5% in the placebo group) and gastrointestinal effects such as diarrhoea (14% versus 10%), nausea (12% versus 9%), abdominal pain (9% versus 4%), vomiting (8% versus 5%), and indigestion (5% versus 3%). Three percent of patients stopped the treatment because of flushing, 4% because of gastrointestinal side effects. A rare but potentially fatal adverse effect may be PML, which has been observed under treatment with dimethyl fumarate.

== Overdose ==
No specific antidote is known. Adverse effects caused by overdosing diroximel fumarate are treated symptomatically.

== Interactions ==
Diroximel fumarate does not interact with cytochrome P450 enzymes or P-glycoprotein. Its active metabolite, monomethyl fumarate, has a relatively low plasma protein binding of 27 to 45%. Therefore, its potential for pharmacokinetic interactions is considered to be low.

Inactivated vaccines can be given under diroximel fumarate therapy, based on experience with other immunosuppressant drugs, such as studies with tetanus, pneumococcal and meningococcal vaccines. No studies regarding the effectiveness of these vaccines under diroximel fumarate have been conducted. No data are available regarding combination with live vaccines, chemotherapy or immunosuppressants. Nephrotoxicity could be increased when the drug is combined with aminoglycoside antibiotics, diuretics, NSAIDs or lithium.

== Pharmacology ==
=== Mechanism of action ===
The drug's mechanism of action is not well understood. In preclinical studies it activated nuclear factor erythroid 2-related factor 2 (NRF2), a transcription factor that is up-regulated under oxidative stress.

=== Pharmacokinetics ===
Monomethyl fumarate (MMF), the active metabolite

Hydroxyethyl succinimide (HES), the primary inactive metabolite

The pharmacokinetics of diroximel fumarate has been found to be practically identical to that of dimethyl fumarate. Both are prodrugs of monomethyl fumarate.

Taking the drug with a high-calorie, high-fat meal slows down absorption, but has no relevant effect on overall absorption. The US label recommends not taking the drug together with high-calorie and high-fat meals.

After ingestion, the substance is cleaved by esterase enzymes before reaching the systemic circulation, resulting in monomethyl fumarate (MMF), the active metabolite, and hydroxyethyl succinimide (HES), which is inactive. Diroximel fumarate itself is not present in the bloodstream. MMF reaches highest concentrations in the blood plasma 2.5 to 3 hours after ingestion. When in the bloodstream, 27 to 45% are bound to plasma proteins.

MMF is further metabolized to fumarate, citrate and glucose, ultimately entering the citric acid cycle and being broken down to carbon dioxide (CO_{2}). About 60% of the substance leave the body as CO_{2} via the lungs, 15.5% are eliminated with the urine (according to another source, less than 0.3%), and 0.9% are eliminated with the faeces. The terminal half-life is one hour.

HES is eliminated mainly with the urine (58 to 63%).

== Chemistry ==
The substance is a white to off-white powder. It is slightly soluble in water; that is, its solubility is between 1:100 and 1:1000. The molecule is achiral. The double bond of the fumarate moiety has E configuration.

== History ==
This drug was formulated by Alkermes in collaboration with Biogen.

== Society and culture ==
=== Legal status ===
Diroximel fumarate was approved for medical use in the United States in October 2019.

In September 2021, the Committee for Medicinal Products for Human Use (CHMP) of the European Medicines Agency (EMA) adopted a positive opinion, recommending the granting of a marketing authorization for the medicinal product Vumerity, intended for the treatment of adults with relapsing remitting multiple sclerosis. The applicant for this medicinal product is Biogen Netherlands B.V. Diroximel fumarate was approved for medical use in the European Union in November 2021.
