= Sifalimumab =

Human monoclonal antibody

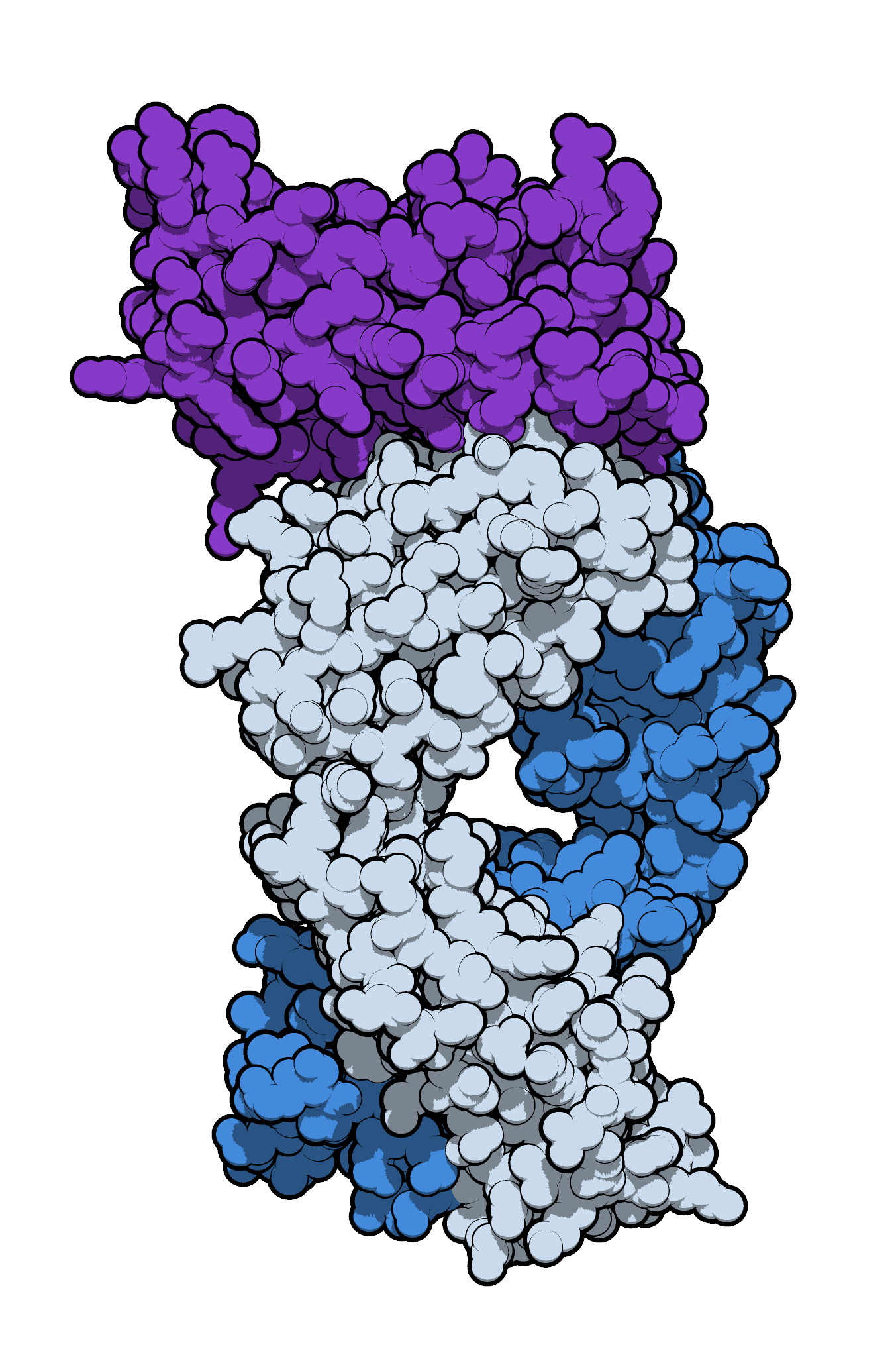
- Fab fragment of sifalimumab bound to IFN-α2A. From PDB: 4ypg.

Monoclonal antibody
- Type: Whole antibody
- Source: Human
- Target: Interferon α

Clinical data
- ATC code: none

Identifiers
- CAS Number: 1006877-41-3
- ChemSpider: none
- UNII: XOY1YA7RMC
- KEGG: D09668

Chemical and physical data
- Formula: C_{6518}H_{10008}N_{1724}O_{2032}S_{38}
- Molar mass: 146252.08 g·mol^{−1}

Sifalimumab is a human monoclonal antibody designed for the treatment of SLE, dermatomyositis, and polymyositis. It targets interferon a.

Sifalimumab was developed by MedImmune; as of 2017 development had been terminated in favor of moving a competing internal product, anifrolumab, into Phase III trials.
