= Lundbeck Seattle Biopharmaceuticals =

Pharmaceutical development company

- Formerly: Alder Biopharmaceuticals
- Company type: Subsidiary
- Founded: 2004; 22 years ago
- Headquarters: Bothell, Washington, U.S.
- Parent: Lundbeck
- Website: https://www.lundbeck.com/us/about-us/lundbeck-in-the-us

Lundbeck Seattle Biopharmaceuticals is a pharmaceutical development company based in Bothell, Washington. Formerly known as Alder Biopharmaceuticals, it specializes in therapeutic monoclonal antibodies.

== Overview ==
In May 2014, Alder went public. In early 2018, the company made a public stock offering, aiming to raise US$250 million. The company identifies, develops, and manufactures antibody therapeutics to alleviate human suffering in cancer, pain, cardiovascular, and autoimmune and inflammatory disease areas.

As of September 2019, the Alder Biopharmaceuticals shares have increased with 83% in price, following the company's acquisition by the Denmark-based H. Lundbeck, in a deal valued at $1.95 billion. The company subsequently changed its name to Lundbeck Seattle Biopharmaceuticals after the acquisition.
