= Sirukumab =

Monoclonal antibody

Monoclonal antibody
- Type: Whole antibody
- Source: Human
- Target: IL6

Clinical data
- ATC code: L04AC15 (WHO)

Identifiers
- CAS Number: 1194585-53-9
- DrugBank: DB11803
- ChemSpider: none
- UNII: 640443FU93
- KEGG: D10080

Chemical and physical data
- Formula: C_{6450}H_{9926}N_{1690}O_{1998}S_{46}
- Molar mass: 144588.95 g·mol^{−1}

Sirukumab (INN, USAN) (developmental code name CNTO-136, tentative brand name Plivensia) is a human monoclonal antibody designed for the treatment of rheumatoid arthritis. It acts against the proinflammatory cytokine Interleukin 6 (IL-6).

Sirukumab is currently under development by Johnson & Johnson's subsidiary Centocor.

== Clinical trials ==
=== Rheumatoid arthritis ===
It has started clinical trials. and reported some phase II results.

In December 2015 three phase III trials (SIRROUND-D, -H and -T) were collecting data. By Feb 2017 SIRROUND-D was considered to have met both co-primary endpoints.

=== Research ===
The drug was previously under development for the treatment of depression.
