= Monomethyl fumarate =

Chemical compound

Clinical data
- Trade names: Bafiertam
- License data: US DailyMed: Monomethyl fumarate
- Routes of administration: By mouth
- ATC code: L04AX11 (WHO)

Legal status
- Legal status: US: ℞-only

Identifiers
- IUPAC name: (2E)-4-methoxy-4-oxobut-2-enoic acid
- CAS Number: 2756-87-8
- PubChem CID: 5369209
- DrugBank: DB14219
- ChemSpider: 4520322
- UNII: 45IUB1PX8R
- KEGG: D11492
- ChEBI: CHEBI:167450
- ChEMBL: ChEMBL589586
- CompTox Dashboard (EPA): DTXSID801016498
- ECHA InfoCard: 100.018.557

Chemical and physical data
- Formula: C_{5}H_{6}O_{4}
- Molar mass: 130.099 g·mol^{−1}
- 3D model (JSmol): Interactive image
- SMILES: COC(=O)C=CC(=O)O
- InChI: InChI=1S/C5H6O4/c1-9-5(8)3-2-4(6)7/h2-3H,1H3,(H,6,7)/b3-2+; Key:NKHAVTQWNUWKEO-NSCUHMNNSA-N

Monomethyl fumarate, sold under the brand name Bafiertam is a medication used for the treatment of relapsing forms of multiple sclerosis, to include clinically isolated syndrome, relapsing-remitting disease, and active secondary progressive disease, in adults. It is taken by mouth.

The most common adverse reactions are flushing, abdominal pain, diarrhea, and nausea.

It was approved for medical use in the United States in April 2020.

== Pharmacology ==
Monomethyl fumarate alters the NFE2L2 (Nuclear factor erythroid 2-related factor 2) transcription factor.

NFE2L2 (or NRF2) is a basic leucine zipper (bZIP) protein that regulates the expression of antioxidant proteins that protect against oxidative damage triggered by injury and inflammation. Several drugs that stimulate the NFE2L2 pathway are being studied for treatment of diseases that are caused by oxidative stress.

Two precursors are also approved:

- Dimethyl fumarate (brand name Tecfidera),
- Diroximel fumarate (brand name Vumerity), approved by the FDA in October 2019.

== Society and culture ==
=== Names ===
Monomethyl fumarate is the international nonproprietary name (INN).
