= Lupus nephritis =

Inflammation of the kidneys

- Other names: SLE nephritis
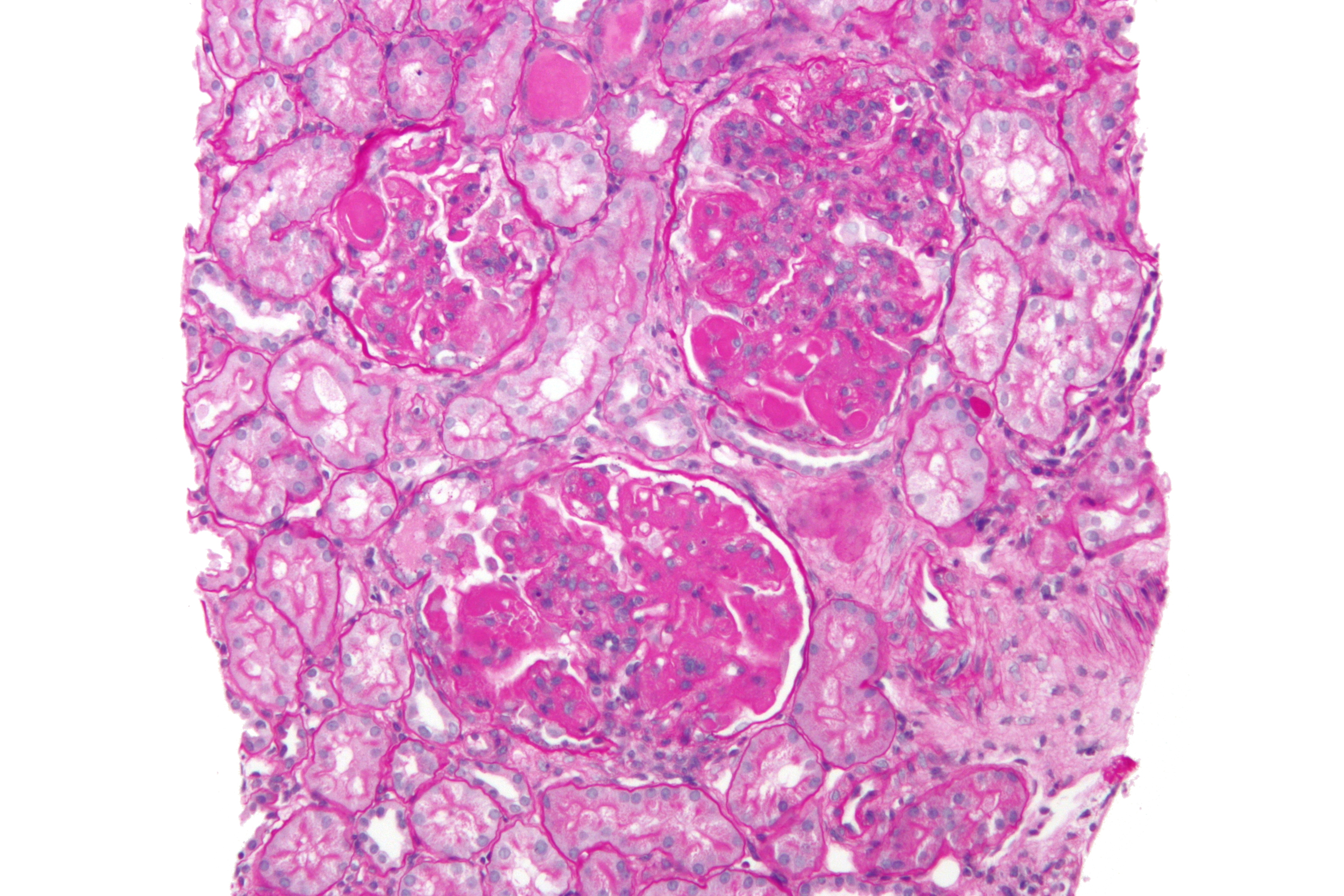
- Micrograph of diffuse proliferative lupus nephritis showing increased mesangial matrix and mesangial hypercellularity. Kidney biopsy. PAS stain.
- Specialty: Nephrology, rheumatology
- Symptoms: Joint pain or swelling
- Causes: Complication of systemic lupus erythematosus.
- Diagnostic method: Complement levels, Urinalysis
- Treatment: Corticosteroids may be used

Lupus nephritis (LN) is an inflammation of the kidneys caused by systemic lupus erythematosus (SLE) and childhood-onset systemic lupus erythematosus which is a more severe form of SLE that develops in children up to 18 years old; both are autoimmune diseases. It is a type of glomerulonephritis in which the glomeruli become inflamed. Since it is a result of SLE, this type of glomerulonephritis is said to be secondary, and has a different pattern and outcome from conditions with a primary cause originating in the kidney. The diagnosis of lupus nephritis depends on blood tests, urinalysis, X-rays, ultrasound scans of the kidneys, and a kidney biopsy. On urinalysis, a nephritic picture is often seen with presence of red blood cell casts, red blood cells and proteinuria however a nephrotic picture may also be seen depending on the classification of lupus nephritis present. New therapies for LN are being developed and tested with significantly improved morbidity and mortality in the past 4 decades.

== Signs and symptoms ==
Since lupus nephritis is a glomerulonephritis that develops secondary to a more general condition called systemic lupus erythematous (SLE), patients may experience common symptoms of SLE such as fever, joint pain, muscle pain, and a butterfly-shaped rash on the face. Early kidney involvement might not cause any distinct symptoms. As the condition progresses, and SLE begins to involve larger portions of the kidney, patients may experience frequent urination, needing to pass urine at night, foamy urine, high blood pressure, and edema.

== Mechanism ==
Lupus nephritis develops through a mix of genetic, environmental, and immune system influences. It is mainly caused by a type III hypersensitivity reaction, where antibodies against double-stranded DNA (anti-dsDNA) form immune complexes with DNA. These complexes build up in areas of the kidney like the mesangium and around the glomerular basement membrane. This triggers the complement system, bringing in neutrophils and other immune cells, which cause inflammation and kidney damage.The pathophysiology of lupus nephritis has autoimmunity contributing significantly. Autoantibodies direct themselves against nuclear elements. The characteristics of nephritogenic autoantibodies (lupus nephritis) are antigen specificity directed at nucleosome, high affinity autoantibodies form intravascular immune complexes, and autoantibodies of certain isotypes activate complement.

== Diagnosis ==
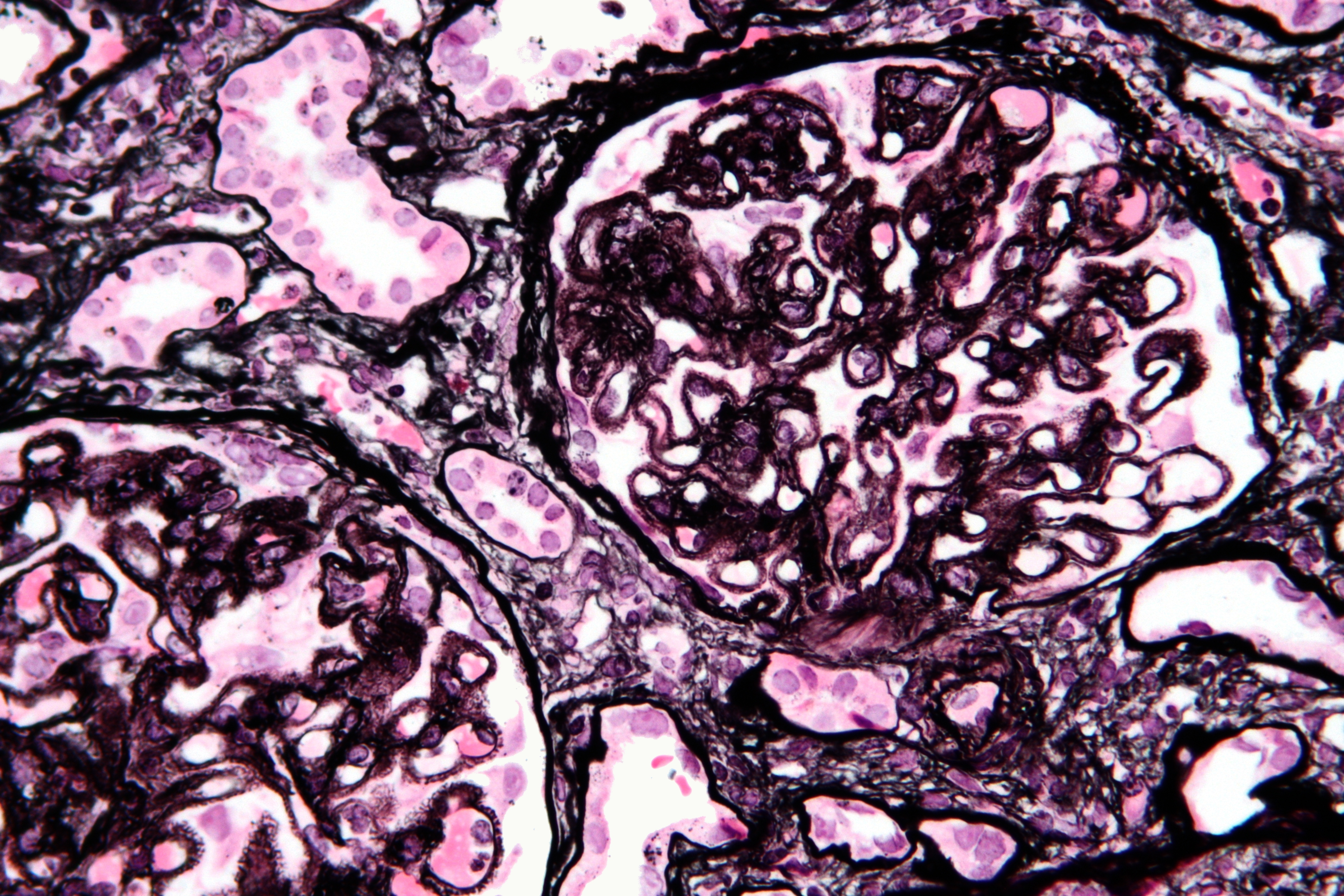
Membranous nephropathy

Oftentimes physical exam findings consistent with kidney damage are not present with early kidney involvement. As such, it is important for patients with known SLE to have frequent follow up to monitor their kidney function through measurements of BUN, creatinine, urinalysis, urine protein/creatinine ratio, and by trending their estimated glomerular filtration rate. If evidence of diminished kidney function is present, additional tests such as anti-dsDNA and complement levels can be ordered to check for signs of a lupus flare. Kidney size is a sensitive measure of renal disease can be measured using renal ultrasound, however changes in kidney size are not specific to LN. If diminished kidney function and evidence of a lupus flare are both present, a renal biopsy can be performed to examine kidney tissue under a microscope for a definitive diagnosis.

A tubuloreticular inclusion within capillary endothelial cells is also characteristic of lupus nephritis and can be seen under an electron microscope in all stages. It is not diagnostic however, as it exists in other conditions such as HIV infection.

=== Classification ===
The World Health Organization and the International Society of Nephrology/Renal Pathology Society has divided lupus nephritis into six classes based on the biopsy. This classification was defined in 1982 and revised in 1995.

Class IV disease (Diffuse proliferative nephritis) is both the most severe, and the most common subtype, involving greater than 50% of glomeruli. Class V disease (Membranous glomerulonephritis) can present on its own, or be seen alongside Class III or IV disease. Class VI (Advanced sclerosing lupus nephritis) is a final class which is included by most practitioners. It is thought to be due to the chronic interferon exposure.

Order	Name	Incidence	Light microscopy	Electron microscopy	Clinical findings and other tests	Treatment
Class I	Minimal mesangial glomerulonephritis	5%	Normal appearance.	Mesangial immune complex deposits are visible under an electron microscope	Kidney failure is very rare in this form. Normal urinalysis, normal or minimal proteinuria, normal serum Cr.	Normally no specific treatment for class I lupus nephritis is needed, however the patient may require active management of SLE.
Class II	Mesangial proliferative glomerulonephritis	20%	Mesangial hypercellularity and matrix expansion.	Mesangial immune complex deposition as seen in Class I LN	Microscopic haematuria with or without proteinuria may be seen. Hypertension, nephrotic syndrome, and acute kidney injury are very rare at this stage.	Responds to high doses of corticosteroids.
Class III	Focal glomerulonephritis	25%	Sclerotic lesions involving less than 50% of the glomeruli, which can be segmental or global, and active or chronic, with endocapillary or extracapillary proliferative lesions.	Subendothelial deposits are noted, and some mesangial changes may be present.	Immunofluorescence reveals a "full house" stain positive for IgG, IgA, IgM, C3, and C1q. Clinically, haematuria and proteinuria are present, with or without nephrotic syndrome, hypertension, and elevated serum creatinine.	Often successfully responds to high doses of corticosteroids with immunosuppressants.
Class IV	Diffuse proliferative nephritis	40%	More than 50% of glomeruli are involved. Lesions can be segmental or global, and active or chronic, with endocapillary or extracapillary proliferative lesions.	Under electron microscopy, subendothelial deposits are noted, and some mesangial changes may be present.	Clinically, haematuria and proteinuria are present, frequently with nephrotic syndrome, hypertension, hypocomplementemia, elevated anti-dsDNA titres and elevated serum creatinine. Kidney failure is common. Diffuse proliferative lupus nephritis as seen in a pathology specimen	Responds to high dose corticosteroids and immunosuppressant drugs.
Class V	Membranous glomerulonephritis	10%	Diffuse thickening of the glomerular capillary wall (segmentally or globally), with diffuse membrane thickening, and subepithelial deposits seen under the electron microscope.	Subepithelial deposits are seen on electron microscopy, a key distinction from other classes of LN.	Signs of nephrotic syndrome. Microscopic haematuria and hypertension may also be seen. Can also lead to thrombotic complications such as renal vein thromboses or pulmonary emboli. Kidney failure is uncommon.	Responds to high dose corticosteroids and immunosuppressant drugs.
Class VI	Advanced sclerosing lupus nephritis.		Global sclerosis involving more than 90% of glomeruli, and represents healing of prior inflammatory injury.		Active glomerulonephritis is not usually present. This stage is characterised by slowly progressive kidney dysfunction, with relatively bland urine sediment.	Response to immunotherapy is usually poor.

== Treatment ==
Cyclophosphamide

Initial drug regimens for patients with active lupus nephritis can be described as dual or triple immunosuppressive therapy. Dual therapy regimens are composed of a corticosteroid and one of the following medications:

- Mycophenolate mofetil (MMF) or enteric coated mycophenolate sodium (EC-MPS)
- Intravenous cyclophosphamide.

Triple immunosuppressive therapy includes a corticosteroid and one of the following combinations of medications:

- MMF or EC-MPS with either a calcineurin inhibitor or belimumab
- Intravenous cyclophosphamide with belimumab.

MMF and cyclophosphamide with corticosteroids are equally effective in achieving remission of the disease, however the results of a systematic review found that immunosuppressive drugs were better than corticosteroids for renal outcomes. MMF is safer than cyclophosphamide with corticosteroids, with less chance of causing ovarian failure, immune problems or hair loss. It also works better than azathioprine with corticosteroids for maintenance therapy. A 2016 network meta-analysis, which included 32 RCTs of lupus nephritis, demonstrated that tacrolimus and MMF followed by azathioprine maintenance were associated with a lower risk of serious infection when compared to other immunosuppressants or glucocorticoids. Individuals with lupus nephritis have a high risk for B-cell lymphoma (which begins in the immune system cells). Voclosporin can also be used to treat LN. Rituximab and obinutuzumab were also tested for treatment of lupus nephritis.

After initial treatment, patients can remain on MMF or can be transitioned to the immune suppressant azathioprine for maintenance therapy. Additionally, patients with LN should also be started on maintenance therapy for SLE with hydroxychloroquine. A systematic review of 21 reviewed studies found that hydroxychloroquine therapy reduced mortality in patients with SLE. Maintenance therapy of LN also focuses on managing other conditions that may contribute to worsening kidney function. This could include managing lipid levels with statin therapy and lowering blood pressure with angiotensin converting enzyme inhibitors or angiotensin II receptor blockers. Ultimately, the goal of maintenance therapy is to reduce the frequency of SLE flairs while preserving as much kidney function as possible.

Lupus nephritis can progress to end stage kidney failure, a condition in which the kidneys can no longer filter blood adequately. These patients require hemodialysis or peritoneal dialysis to clean their blood of the toxic metabolites that would otherwise build up. Dialysis may be used temporarily to bridge patients to kidney transplantation, or a permanent treatment for those who are not candidates for transplant.

== Prognosis ==
In those who have SLE, concomitant lupus nephritis is associated with a worse overall prognosis. 10-30% of people with lupus nephritis progress to kidney failure requiring dialysis, with the 5 year mortality rate of lupus nephritis being 5-25%. The proliferative forms of lupus nephritis are associated with a higher risk of progression to end stage kidney disease. A study reviewing mortality in patients with end stage kidney disease secondary to lupus nephritis from 1995-2014 found a significant reduction in mortality rate attributed to advancements in management. Black and Hispanic people with lupus nephritis are more likely to present with severe disease at initial presentation (with more proteinuria and more extensive histopathologic changes) and progress to end stage kidney disease. This is thought to be due to socioeconomic factors but auto-antibodies strongly associated with lupus nephritis such as anti-Sm, anti-Ro and anti-ribonucleoprotein are also more commonly seen in Black and Hispanic people. SLE affects women disproportionately to men in a 9:1 ratio however men with SLE tend to have more aggressive forms of lupus nephritis as well a higher risk of progression to end stage kidney disease and higher risk of concurrent cardiovascular disease.

== Epidemiology ==
Lupus nephritis affects approximately 3 out of 10,000 people. 40% of patients with SLE will develop lupus nephritis with most diagnoses made within 5 years of the initial SLE diagnosis. Of those patients with lupus nephritis, 10% will develop end stage kidney disease. Although pediatric onset SLE is rare, these patients tend to have more significant multiorgan involvement with more than 90% of patients developing lupus nephritis within 2 years of diagnosis.
