= Tocilizumab =

Immunosuppressive drug

Monoclonal antibody
- Type: Whole antibody
- Source: Humanized (from mouse)
- Target: IL-6 receptor

Clinical data
- Trade names: Actemra, Roactemra
- Biosimilars: tocilizumab-aazg, tocilizumab-anoh, tocilizumab-bavi, Avtozma, Tofidence, Tyenne, Tuyory
- AHFS/Drugs.com: Monograph
- MedlinePlus: a611004
- License data: US DailyMed: Tocilizumab
- Pregnancy category: AU: C
- Routes of administration: Intravenous, subcutaneous
- ATC code: L04AC07 (WHO)

Legal status
- Legal status: AU: S4 (Prescription only); CA: ℞-only; US: ℞-only and Emergency Use Authorization; EU: Rx-only; In general: ℞ (Prescription only)

Pharmacokinetic data
- Elimination half-life: 8–14 days during steady state (dependent on concentration)

Identifiers
- CAS Number: 375823-41-9
- DrugBank: DB06273
- ChemSpider: none
- UNII: I031V2H011
- KEGG: D02596
- ChEMBL: ChEMBL1237022

Chemical and physical data
- Formula: C_{6428}H_{9976}N_{1720}O_{2018}S_{42}
- Molar mass: 144987.06 g·mol^{−1}

Tocilizumab, sold under the brand name Actemra among others, is an immunosuppressive drug, used for the treatment of rheumatoid arthritis, systemic juvenile idiopathic arthritis, polyarticular juvenile idiopathic arthritis, giant cell arteritis, cytokine release syndrome, COVID‑19, and systemic sclerosis-associated interstitial lung disease (SSc-ILD). It is a recombinant humanized monoclonal antibody of the immunoglobulin IgG1 subclass against the interleukin-6 receptor (IL-6R). Interleukin 6 (IL-6) is a cytokine that plays an important role in immune response and is implicated in the pathogenesis of many diseases, such as autoimmune diseases, multiple myeloma and prostate cancer. Tocilizumab was jointly developed by Osaka University and Chugai, and was licensed in 2003 by Hoffmann-La Roche.

Tocilizumab was approved for medical use in the European Union in January 2009, and in the United States in January 2010.

== Medical uses ==
In the United States, tocilizumab is indicated for the treatment of rheumatoid arthritis, giant cell arteritis, systemic sclerosis-associated interstitial lung disease, polyarticular juvenile idiopathic arthritis, systemic juvenile idiopathic arthritis, cytokine release syndrome, and COVID‑19.

In the European Union, tocilizumab is indicated for the treatment of rheumatoid arthritis, systemic juvenile idiopathic arthritis, juvenile idiopathic polyarthritis, giant cell arteritis, cytokine release syndrome, and COVID‑19.

=== Rheumatoid arthritis ===
Tocilizumab is used for the treatment of moderate to severe rheumatoid arthritis, applied in combination with methotrexate, if other drugs like disease-modifying antirheumatic drugs (DMARDs) and TNF alpha blockers have proven to be ineffective or were not tolerated. It can be used as a monotherapy for patients who do not tolerate methotrexate. The drug slows down the progression of the disease and can improve physical function of patients.

=== Systemic juvenile idiopathic arthritis ===
The treatment of systemic juvenile idiopathic arthritis is similar to rheumatoid arthritis treatment: tocilizumab is combined with methotrexate unless the latter is not tolerated. General safety and effectiveness is established for children of two years and older. In 2011, the US Food and Drug Administration (FDA) approved tocilizumab for the treatment of active systemic juvenile idiopathic arthritis.

=== Castleman's disease ===
In Japan, tocilizumab is also approved for the treatment of Castleman's disease, a rare benign tumor of B cells.

=== Giant cell arteritis ===
In May 2017, the FDA approved tocilizumab for giant cell arteritis.

=== Cytokine release syndrome ===
On 30 August 2017, the FDA approved tocilizumab for cytokine release syndrome, a side effect of CAR-T cell therapies.

=== COVID-19 ===
As early as March 2020, at the height of the pandemic in Italy, Paolo Antonio Ascierto, an Italian oncologist, researched alongside his colleagues the use of the arthritis drug tocilizumab to treat severe COVID-19 pneumonia, seeing some results. The results were recognized nationally and prompted national calls for treatment protocols surrounding the research. Ascierto was heard in an official hearing at the Italian Chamber of Deputies, presenting data suggesting tocilizumab reduced COVID-19 mortality by approximately 22% in clinical use, underscoring its potential benefit. Paolo was at the center of the development of multicenter evaluations of tocilizumab against COVID-19 pneumonia during the whole year, being essential to it.

In 2021 his research of the usage of tocilizumab against COVID-19 was evaluated by the European Medicines Agency and the European Union, where Ascierto was called to as to support such thesis.

In June 2021, the US Food and Drug Administration (FDA) issued an emergency use authorization (EUA) for tocilizumab for the treatment of COVID‑19 in hospitalized people aged two years of age and older who are receiving systemic corticosteroids and require supplemental oxygen, non-invasive or invasive mechanical ventilation, or extracorporeal membrane oxygenation (ECMO). The FDA approved tocilizumab for those indications in December 2022.

== Adverse effects ==
The most common adverse effects observed in clinical trials were upper respiratory tract infections (more than 10% of patients), nasopharyngitis (common cold), headache, and high blood pressure (at least 5%). The enzyme alanine transaminase was also elevated in at least 5% of patients, but in most cases without symptoms. Elevated total cholesterol levels were common. Among the less common side effects were dizziness, various infections, as well as reactions of the skin and mucosae like mild rashes, gastritis and mouth ulcer. Rare but severe reactions were gastrointestinal perforations (0.26% in six months) and anaphylaxis (0.2%).

== Interactions ==
There are no certain interactions with other drugs. The blood plasma levels of simvastatin were reduced by 57% after a single dose of tocilizumab, but it is not known whether this is clinically relevant. A possible mechanism is that the elevated IL-6 levels of patients with rheumatoid arthritis suppress the biosynthesis of various cytochrome P450 enzymes, notably CYP1A2, CYP2C9, CYP2C19 and CYP3A4. Tocilizumab lowers IL-6 and thus normalises cytochrome levels, increasing the metabolization of simvastatin (and possibly other cytochrome metabolised drugs).

== Mechanism of action ==
Besides other functions, interleukin 6 (IL-6) is involved in the development of immunological and inflammatory reactions. Some autoimmune diseases like rheumatoid arthritis are associated with abnormally high IL-6 levels. Tocilizumab binds soluble as well as membrane bound interleukin-6 receptors, hindering IL-6 from exerting its pro-inflammatory effects. It has been noted that the membrane bound form and soluble form of the IL-6 receptor may have different effects in the pathogenesis of rheumatoid arthritis with the soluble form being more implicated in disease progression.

== History ==
Interleukin 6 and its receptor were discovered and cloned at Osaka University, Japan, by Tadamitsu Kishimoto in the 1980s. In 1997, Chugai Pharmaceuticals began the clinical development of tocilizumab for the treatment of rheumatoid arthritis. Clinical studies for Castleman's disease and systemic juvenile idiopathic arthritis started in 2001 and 2002, respectively. Hoffmann–La Roche co-developed the drug due to a license agreement in 2003.

Data presented in 2008 showed the effectiveness of tocilizumab in combination therapy with methotrexate for rheumatoid arthritis treatment. In further studies, it was effective and generally well tolerated when administered either as monotherapy or in combination with conventional DMARDs in adult patients with moderate to severe rheumatoid arthritis.

In June 2005, tocilizumab was approved in Japan for Castleman's disease. In January 2009, the drug was approved by the European Medicines Agency (EMA) as Roactemra for the treatment of rheumatoid arthritis under the mentioned restrictions. On 11 January 2010, it was approved by the U.S. FDA as Actemra for the same purpose. Tocilizumab was approved by Australia's Therapeutic Goods Administration on 27 May 2009 and was listed on the Pharmaceutical Benefits Scheme from August 2010. In New Zealand, tocilizumab was approved for distribution in July 2009, and Pharmac approved subsidising it with special authority restrictions in July 2013, for systemic juvenile idiopathic arthritis and in July 2014, for rheumatoid arthritis. The FDA approved tocilizumab for the treatment of systemic juvenile idiopathic arthritis for children from two years of age in April 2011, and the EMA followed in August the same year.

Tocilizumab is marketed by Chugai in some countries, especially in Japan and other Asian countries, and jointly by Chugai and Roche (Hoffmann–La Roche's holding company) in others, for example Great Britain, France and Germany.

== Society and culture ==
=== Legal status ===
Tocilizumab was approved for medical use in the European Union in January 2009, and in the United States in January 2010.

==== Biosimilars ====
In September 2023, Tyenne became the first tocilizumab biosimilar authorized for medical use in the European Union, and in March 2024, became the first biosimilar with both intravenous and subcutaneous formulations to be approved in the United States.

In April 2024, the Committee for Medicinal Products for Human Use (CHMP) of the European Medicines Agency adopted a positive opinion, recommending the granting of a marketing authorization for the medicinal product Tofidence, intended for the treatment of rheumatoid arthritis (RA), systemic juvenile idiopathic arthritis (sJIA), polyarticular juvenile idiopathic arthritis (pJIA) and coronavirus disease 2019 (COVID-19). The applicant for this medicinal product is Biogen Netherlands B.V. Tofidence is a biosimilar medicinal product. Tofidence was authorized for medical use in the European Union in June 2024.

Tyenne was approved for medical use in Canada in October 2024.

In December 2024, the CHMP adopted a positive opinion, recommending the granting of a marketing authorization for the medicinal product Avtozma, intended for the treatment of rheumatoid arthritis, systemic juvenile idiopathic arthritis, polyarticular juvenile idiopathic arthritis, giant cell arteritis, CAR-T cell-induced severe or life-threatening cytokine release syndrome and COVID-19. The applicant for this medicinal product is Celltrion Healthcare Hungary Kft. Avtozma is a biosimilar medicinal product.

Tocilizumab-anoh (Avtozma) was approved for medical use in the United States in January 2025.

Avtozma was approved for medical use in Canada in October 2025.

==== COVID-19 ====
Tocilizumab was approved for the treatment of COVID‑19 in the European Union in December 2021, and in the United States in December 2022.

In September 2021, Indian pharmaceutical firm Hetero obtained emergency use approval from the country's health authority, Drugs Controller General of India (DCGI), to produce a generic version of tocilizumab to treat COVID‑19 in adults.

In December 2021, tocilizumab was granted a provisional approval by the Australian regulator, Therapeutic Goods Administration, for treatment of adults.

Tocilizumab was granted an emergency use authorization (EUA) for the treatment of COVID‑19 in the United States in June 2021. It was approved for the treatment of COVID‑19 in the European Union in December 2021, and in the United States in December 2022.

== Research ==
Tocilizumab is being studied for pulmonary arterial hypertension (PAH). Tocilizumab is under evaluation in a multicenter clinical trial (ALL-IN) for the prevention of acute cellular rejection in status post heart transplant patients. A small initial study has suggested that Tocilizumab may be helpful for difficult-to-treat depression. Larger follow-up studies are required.

=== COVID-19 ===
There is good evidence tocilizumab can help reduce the need for mechanical ventilation for people in hospital with COVID‑19, and some evidence it can help prevent secondary infections.

A 2021 meta-analysis of randomized controlled trials found that, while tocilizumab does not show significant benefits on survival, it could play a role in preventing progression to intensive care and mechanical ventilation.

=== Neuromyelitis optica ===
Early case reports suggest tocilizumab might be effective in otherwise refractory neuromyelitis optica (NMO, Devic's disease).

=== Graves' ophthalmopathy ===
Two small studies found tocilizumab to be beneficial in endocrine ophthalmopathy (Graves' orbitopathy) that is refractory to corticosteroid treatment.
