= Janus kinase 3 =

Mammalian protein found in Homo sapiens

JAK3

Identifiers
- Aliases: JAK3, JAK-3, JAK3_HUMAN, JAKL, L-JAK, LJAK, Janus kinase 3
- External IDs: OMIM: 600173; MGI: 99928; GeneCards: JAK3
Available structures
PDB	Ortholog search: PDBe RCSB
PDB	List of PDB id codes 4RIO, 1YVJ, 3LXK, 3LXL, 3PJC, 3ZC6, 3ZEP, 4HVD, 4HVG, 4HVH, 4HVI, 4I6Q, 4QPS, 4QT1, 4V0G, 4Z16
Enzyme activity
EC #	BRENDA	ExPASy	KEGG	MetaCyc
2.7.10.2	↗	↗	↗	↗

Gene location (Human)
Chr.	Chromosome 19 (human)
Band	19p13.11	Start	17,824,780 bp
Band	19p13.11	End	17,848,071 bp

Gene location (Mouse)
Chr.	Chromosome 8 (mouse)
Band	8 B3.3|8 34.43 cM	Start	72,128,940 bp
Band	8 B3.3|8 34.43 cM	End	72,143,219 bp
RNA expression pattern
Bgee	Human / Mouse (ortholog); Top expressed in: granulocyte; blood; spleen; lymph node; monocyte; appendix; mucosa of ileum; left ovary; right ovary; epithelium of nasopharynx / Top expressed in: lactiferous gland; granulocyte; thymus; muscle of thigh; lymph node; yolk sac; right kidney; spleen; subcutaneous adipose tissue; mesenteric lymph nodes; More reference expression data
BioGPS	n/a
Gene ontology
Molecular function	transferase activity; nucleotide binding; protein kinase activity; non-membrane spanning protein tyrosine kinase activity; kinase activity; protein binding; protein tyrosine kinase activity; protein phosphatase binding; signaling receptor binding; ATP binding
Cellular component	cytoplasm; membrane; extrinsic component of cytoplasmic side of plasma membrane; cytoskeleton; endomembrane system; cytosol; endosome; plasma membrane
Biological process	negative regulation of FasL production; negative regulation of interleukin-10 production; growth hormone receptor signaling pathway via JAK-STAT; response to interleukin-15; intracellular signal transduction; adaptive immune response; response to interleukin-4; phosphorylation; interleukin-4-mediated signaling pathway; immune system process; response to interleukin-2; negative regulation of thymocyte apoptotic process; MAPK cascade; T cell homeostasis; tyrosine phosphorylation of STAT protein; protein phosphorylation; negative regulation of T-helper 1 cell differentiation; negative regulation of dendritic cell cytokine production; regulation of T cell apoptotic process; positive regulation of T cell proliferation; peptidyl-tyrosine autophosphorylation; peptidyl-tyrosine phosphorylation; B cell differentiation; negative regulation of T cell activation; enzyme linked receptor protein signaling pathway; cell migration; response to interleukin-9; negative regulation of interleukin-12 production; innate immune response; inflammatory response; erythrocyte differentiation; regulation of apoptotic process; interleukin-7-mediated signaling pathway; interleukin-15-mediated signaling pathway; interleukin-9-mediated signaling pathway; cytokine-mediated signaling pathway; interleukin-2-mediated signaling pathway; interleukin-21-mediated signaling pathway; regulation of receptor signaling pathway via JAK-STAT
Sources:Amigo / QuickGO
Orthologs
Databases	NCBI: entry; OMA: entry
Species	Human	Mouse
Entrez	3718	16453
Ensembl	ENSG00000105639	ENSMUSG00000031805
UniProt	P52333	Q62137
RefSeq (mRNA)	NM_000215	NM_001190830; NM_010589
RefSeq (protein)	NP_000206	NP_001177759; NP_034719
Location (UCSC)	Chr 19: 17.82 – 17.85 Mb	Chr 8: 72.13 – 72.14 Mb
PubMed search
- Wikidata
View/Edit Human	View/Edit Mouse

Tyrosine-protein kinase JAK3 is a tyrosine kinase enzyme that in humans is encoded by the JAK3 gene.

== Janus kinases ==
Janus kinase 3 is a tyrosine kinase that belongs to the janus family of kinases. Other members of the Janus family include JAK1, JAK2 and TYK2. Janus kinases (JAKs) are relatively large kinases of approximately 1150 amino acids with apparent molecular weights of 120-130 kDa. They are cytosolic tyrosine kinases that are specifically associated with cytokine receptors. Since cytokine receptor proteins lack enzymatic activity, they are dependent upon JAKs to initiate signaling upon binding of their ligands (e.g. cytokines). The cytokine receptors can be divided into five major subgroups based on their different domains and activation motifs. JAK3 is required for signaling of the type I receptors that use the common gamma chain (γc). Studies suggest Jak3 plays essential roles in immune and nonimmune cell physiology. Epithelial Jak3 is important for the regulation of epithelial-mesenchymal transition, cell survival, cell growth, development, and differentiation. Growth factors and cytokines produced by the cells of hematopoietic origin use Jak kinases for signal transduction in both immune and nonimmune cells. Among Jaks, Jak3 is widely expressed in both immune cells and in intestinal epithelial cells (IECs) of both humans and mice. Mutations that abrogate Jak3 functions cause an autosomal severe combined immunodeficiency disease (SCID) while activating Jak3 mutations lead to the development of hematologic and epithelial cancers. A selective Jak3 inhibitor tofacitinib (Xeljanz) approved by the FDA for certain chronic inflammatory conditions demonstrates immunosuppressive activity in rheumatoid arthritis, psoriasis, and organ transplant rejection. However, Jak3-directed drugs also inflict adverse effects due to its essential role in mucosal epithelial functions. Structural implications of Jak3 domains beyond the immune cells are also explained. As information about the roles of Jak3 in gastrointestinal functions and associated diseases are only just emerging, its implications in gastrointestinal wound repair, inflammatory bowel disease, obesity-associated metabolic syndrome, and epithelial cancers are being deciphered in the literature.

Some cytokine receptors and their involvement with JAK kinases
Type	Subgroup	Cytokine Receptor	JAK Kinase
I	homodimeric	EPO, TPO, GH, G-CSF	JAK2
I	uses common beta chain (CSF2RΒ)	IL-3, IL-5, GM-CSF	JAK2
I	uses gp130 chain	IL-6, IL-11	JAK1, JAK2, Tyk2
I	uses common gamma chain (γc)	IL-2, IL-4, IL-7, IL-9, IL-15, IL-21	JAK1, JAK3
II		IFN-α, IFN-β, IFN-γ	JAK1, JAK2, Tyk2

== Function ==
As JAK3 is expressed in hematopoietic and epithelial cells, its role in cytokine signaling is thought to be more restricted than other JAKs. It is most commonly expressed in T cells and NK cells, but has also been found in intestinal epithelial cells. JAK3 is involved in signal transduction by receptors that employ the common gamma chain (γc) of the type I cytokine receptor family (e.g. IL-2R, IL-4R, IL-7R, IL-9R, IL-15R, and IL-21R). Mutations that abrogate Janus kinase 3 function cause an autosomal SCID (severe combined immunodeficiency disease), while activating Janus kinase 3 mutations lead to the development of leukemia.

In addition to its well-known roles in T cells and NK cells, JAK3 has been found to mediate IL-8 stimulation in human neutrophils. IL-8 primarily functions to induce chemotaxis in neutrophils and lymphocytes, and JAK3 silencing severely inhibits IL-8-mediated chemotaxis.

=== Intestinal epithelial cells ===
Jak3 interacts with actin-binding protein villin, thereby facilitating cytoskeletal remodeling and mucosal wound repair. Structural determinants that regulate the interactions between Jak3 and cytoskeletal proteins of the villin / gelsolin family have also been characterized. Functional reconstitution of kinase activity by recombinant Jak3 using Jak3-wt or villin/gelsolin-wt as substrate showed that Jak3 autophosphorylation was the rate-limiting step during interactions between Jak3 and cytoskeletal proteins. Kinetic parameters showed that phosphorylated (P) Jak3 binds to P-villin with a dissociation constant (K_{d}) of 23 nM and a Hill's coefficient of 3.7. Pairwise binding between Jak3 mutants and villin showed that the FERM domain of Jak3 was sufficient for binding to P-villin with a K_{d} of 40.0 nM. However, the SH2 domain of Jak3 prevented P-villin from binding to the FERM domain of nonphosphorylated protein. The intramolecular interaction between the FERM and SH2 domains of nonphosphorylated Jak3 prevented Jak3 from binding to villin and tyrosine autophosphorylation of Jak3 at the SH2 domain decreased these intramolecular interactions and facilitated binding of the FERM domain to villin. These demonstrate the molecular mechanism of interactions between Jak3 and cytoskeletal proteins where tyrosine phosphorylation of the SH2 domain acted as an intramolecular switch for the interactions between Jak3 and cytoskeletal proteins.

Sustained damage to the mucosal lining in patients with inflammatory bowel disease (IBD) facilitates translocation of intestinal microbes to submucosal immune cells leading to chronic inflammation. IL-2 plays a role in intestinal epithelial cell (IEC) homeostasis through concentration-dependent regulation of IEC proliferation and cell death. Activation by IL-2 led to tyrosine phosphorylation-dependent interactions between Jak3 and p52ShcA only at lower concentrations. Higher concentrations of IL-2 decreased the phosphorylation of Jak3, disrupted its interactions with p52ShcA, redistributed Jak3 to the nucleus, and induced apoptosis in IEC. IL-2 also induced dose-dependent downregulation of jak3-mRNA. Constitutive overexpression and mir-shRNA-mediated knockdown studies showed that expression of Jak3 was necessary for IL-2-induced proliferation of IEC. Additionally, IL-2-induced downregulation of jak3-mRNA was responsible for higher IL-2-induced apoptosis in IEC. Thus IL-2-induced mucosal homeostasis through posttranslational and transcriptional regulation of Jak3.

Jak3 is also implicated in mucosal differentiation and predisposition to inflammatory bowel disease in mice model. These studies show that Jak3 is expressed in colonic mucosa of mice, and the loss of mucosal expression of Jak3 results in reduced expression of differentiation markers for the cells of both enterocytic and secretory lineages. Jak3 KO mice showed reduced expression of colonic villin, carbonic anhydrase, secretory mucin muc2, and increased basal colonic inflammation reflected by increased levels of pro-inflammatory cytokines IL-6 and IL-17A in colon along with increased colonic myeloperoxidase activity. The inflammations in KO mice were associated with shortening of colon length, reduced cecum length, decreased crypt heights, and increased severity toward dextran sulfate sodium-induced colitis. In differentiated human colonic epithelial cells, Jak3 redistributed to basolateral surfaces and interacted with adherens junction (AJ) protein β-catenin. Jak3 expression in these cells was essential for AJ localization of β-catenin and maintenance of epithelial barrier functions. Collectively, these results demonstrate the essential role of Jak3 in the colon where it facilitated mucosal differentiation by promoting the expression of differentiation markers and enhanced colonic barrier functions through AJ localization of β-catenin.

Though constitutive activation of Janus kinase 3 (Jak3) leads to different cancers, the mechanism of trans-molecular regulation of Jak3 activation is only recently reported. This study showed that Jak3 auto-phosphorylation was the rate limiting step during Jak3 trans-phosphorylation of Shc where Jak3 directly phosphorylated (P) two tyrosine residues in SH-2-domain, and one tyrosine residue each in CH-1, and PID domains of Shc. Direct interactions between mutants of Jak3 and Shc showed that while FERM domain of Jak3 was sufficient for binding to Shc, CH-1 and PID domains of Shc were responsible for binding to Jak3. Functionally, Jak3 was auto-phosphorylated under IL-2 stimulation in epithelial cells. However, Shc recruited tyrosine phosphatase SHP-2 and PTP-1B to Jak3 and thereby dephosphorylate Jak3. Thus the study not only characterized Jak3 interaction with Shc, but also demonstrated the mechanism of intracellular regulation of Jak3 activation where Jak3 interactions with Shc acted as a regulator of Jak3 dephosphorylation through direct interactions of Shc with both Jak3 and tyrosine phosphatases.

Chronic low-grade inflammation (CLGI) plays a key role in metabolic deterioration in the obese population. Jak3 expression and activation provide protection against development of CLGI and associated health complications. Studies in rodent model show that loss of Jak3 results in increased body weight, basal systemic CLGI, compromised glycemic homeostasis, hyperinsulinemia, and early symptoms of liver steatosis. Lack of Jak3 also results in exaggerated symptoms of metabolic syndrome by western high-fat diet. Mechanistically, it is shown that Jak3 is essential for reduced expression and activation of toll like receptors (TLRs) in murine intestinal mucosa and human intestinal epithelial cells where Jak3 interacted with and activated p85, the regulatory sub-unit of the PI3K, through tyrosine phosphorylation of adapter protein insulin receptor substrate (IRS1). These interactions resulted in activation of PI3K-Akt axis, which was essential for reduced TLR expression and TLR associated NF-κB activation. Overall, Jak3 plays an essential role in promoting mucosal tolerance through suppressed expression and limiting activation of TLRs thereby preventing intestinal and systemic CLGI and associated obesity and MetS.

Compromise in adherens junctions (AJs) is associated with several chronic inflammatory diseases. Functional characterization showed that Jak3 autophosphorylation was the rate-limiting step during Jak3 trans-phosphorylation of β-catenin, where Jak3 directly phosphorylated three tyrosine residues, viz. Tyr30, Tyr64, and Tyr86 in the N-terminal domain (NTD) of β-catenin. However, prior phosphorylation of β-catenin at Tyr654 was essential for further phosphorylation of β-catenin by Jak3. Interaction studies indicated that phosphorylated Jak3 bound to phosphorylated β-catenin with a dissociation constant of 0.28 μm, and although both the kinase and FERM (Band 4.1, ezrin, radixin, and moesin) domains of Jak3 interacted with β-catenin, the NTD domain of β-catenin facilitated its interactions with Jak3. Physiologically, Jak3-mediated phosphorylation of β-catenin suppressed EGF-mediated epithelial–mesenchymal transition (EMT)and facilitated epithelial barrier functions by AJ localization of phosphorylated β-catenin through its interactions with α-catenin. Moreover, loss of Jak3-mediated phosphorylation sites in β-catenin abrogated its AJ localization and compromised epithelial barrier functions. Together, this study not only characterized Jak3 interaction with β-catenin but also demonstrated the mechanism of molecular interplay between AJ dynamics and EMT by Jak3-mediated NTD phosphorylation of β-catenin.

Breast cancer resistance protein (BCRP) is a member of ATP-binding cassette (ABC) transporter proteins whose primary function is to efflux substrates bound to the plasma membrane. Impaired intestinal barrier functions play a major role in chronic low-grade inflammation (CLGI)-associated obesity, but the regulation of BCRP during obesity and its role in maintaining the intestinal barrier function during CLGI-associated obesity were unknown. Using several approaches, including efflux assays, immunoprecipitation/-blotting/-histochemistry, paracellular permeability assay, fluorescence activated cell sorting, cytokine assay, and immunofluorescence microscopy, recent studies suggest that obese individuals have compromised intestinal BCRP functions and that diet-induced obese mice recapitulate these outcomes. It was also demonstrated that the compromised BCRP functions during obesity were due to loss of Janus kinase 3 (JAK3)-mediated tyrosine phosphorylation of BCRP. Results in the studies indicated that JAK3-mediated phosphorylation of BCRP promotes its interactions with membrane-localized β-catenin essential not only for BCRP expression and surface localization, but also for the maintenance of BCRP-mediated intestinal drug efflux and barrier functions. It was observed that reduced intestinal JAK3 expression during human obesity or JAK3 knockout in mouse or siRNA-mediated β-catenin knockdown in human intestinal epithelial cells all result in significant loss of intestinal BCRP expression and compromised colonic drug efflux and barrier functions. These results uncover a mechanism of BCRP-mediated intestinal drug efflux and barrier functions and establish a role for BCRP in preventing CLGI-associated obesity both in humans and in mice. These studies have wider implications not only in our understanding of physiological and pathophysiological mechanisms of intestinal barrier functions and CLGI associated chronic inflammatory diseases but also in protein-mediated drug-efflux pharmacokinetic and pharmacodynamic characteristics of oral drug formulations.

A compromise in intestinal mucosal functions is associated with several chronic inflammatory diseases. Previous report suggested that obese humans have a reduced expression of intestinal Jak3 and a deficiency of Jak3 in mice led to predisposition to obesity-associated metabolic syndrome. Since meta-analyses show cognitive impairment as co-morbidity of obesity, recent studies demonstrate the mechanistic role of Jak3 in obesity associated cognitive impairment. It is shown that high-fat diet (HFD) suppresses Jak3 expression both in the intestinal mucosa and in the brain of wild-type mice. Recapitulating these conditions using global (Jak3-KO) and intestinal epithelial cell-specific conditional (IEC-Jak3-KO) mice and using cognitive testing, western analysis, flow cytometry, immunofluorescence microscopy and 16s rRNA sequencing, It was demonstrated that HFD-induced Jak3 deficiency is responsible for cognitive impairments in mice, and these are, in part, specifically due to intestinal epithelial deficiency of Jak3. It was revealed that Jak3 deficiency leads to gut dysbiosis, compromised TREM-2-functions-mediated activation of microglial cells, increased TLR-4 expression and HIF1-α-mediated inflammation in the brain. Together, these led to compromised microglial-functions-mediated increased deposition of Aβ and pTau, responsible for cognitive impairments. Collectively, these data illustrated how the drivers of obesity promote cognitive impairment and demonstrate the underlying mechanism where HFD-mediated impact on IEC-Jak3 deficiency is responsible for Jak3 deficiency in the brain, reduced microglial TREM2 expression, microglial activation and compromised clearance of Aβ and pTau as the mechanism during obesity-associated cognitive impairments. Thus, the study not only demonstrated the mechanism of obesity-associated cognitive impairments but also characterize the tissue-specific role of Jak3 in such conditions through mucosal tolerance, gut–brain axis, and regulation of microglial functions.

== Signal transduction model ==
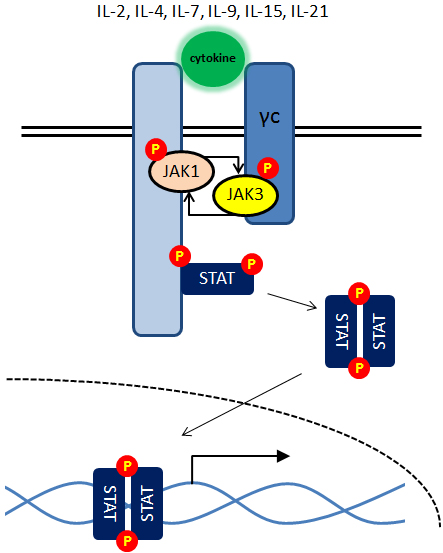
Activation of JAK3 by cytokine receptors that contain the common gamma chain (γc)

JAK3 is activated only by cytokines whose receptors contain the common gamma chain (γc) subunit: IL-2, IL-4, IL-7, IL-9, IL-15 and IL-21. Cytokine binding induces the association of separate cytokine receptor subunits and the activation of the receptor-associated JAKs. In the absence of cytokine, JAKs lack protein tyrosine kinase activity. Once activated, the JAKs create docking sites for the STAT transcription factors by phosphorylation of specific tyrosine residues on the cytokine receptor subunits. STATs (signal transduction and activators of transcription) are members of a family of transcription factors, and they have src homology 2 (SH2) domains that allow them to bind to these phosphorylated tyrosine residues. After undergoing JAK-mediated phosphorylation, the STAT transcription factors dimerize, translocate to the nucleus, bind DNA at specific elements and induce expression of specific genes. Cytokine receptors selectively activate particular JAK-STAT pathways to induce transcription of different genes. IL-2 and IL-4 activate JAK1, JAK3 and STAT5.

== Disease relevance ==
JAK3 activating mutations are found in 16% of T-cell acute lymphoblastic leukemia (T-ALL) patients. In addition, oncogenic JAK3 mutations have been identified in acute megakaryoblastic leukemia, T-cell prolymphocytic leukemia, and juvenile myelomonocytic leukemia and natural killer T-cell lymphoma (NK/T-lymphoma). Most mutations are located in the pseudokinase and kinase domain of the JAK3 protein. Most JAK3 mutations are dependent on JAK1 kinase activity for their transforming capacities.

Inactivating mutations of JAK3 are known causes of immune deficiency. Mutations in the common gamma chain (γc) result in X-linked severe combined immunodeficiency (X-SCID). Since γc specifically associates with JAK3, mutations in JAK3 also result in SCID. Deficiency of JAK3 blocks signaling of the following cytokines and their effects:

- IL-2 - T cell proliferation and maintenance of peripheral tolerance
- IL-4 - differentiation of Th2 cells
- IL-7 - thymocyte development in the thymus
- IL-9 - survival signal for various hematopoietic cells
- IL-15 - NK cell development
- IL-21 - regulation of immunoglobulin class switching in B cells

Overall, JAK3 deficiency results in the phenotype of SCID characterized by T^{−}B^{+}NK^{−}, which indicates the absence of T cells and NK cells. Although B cells are present, they are non-functional due to defective B cell activation and impaired antibody class switching.

Since JAK3 is required for immune cell development, targeting JAK3 could be a useful strategy to generate a novel class of immunosuppressant drugs. Moreover, unlike other JAKs, JAK3 is primarily expressed in hematopoietic cells, so a highly specific JAK3 inhibitor should have precise effects on immune cells and minimal pleiotropic defects. The selectivity of a JAK3 inhibitor would also have advantages over the current widely used immunosuppressant drugs, which have abundant targets and diverse side effects. A JAK3 inhibitor could be useful for treating autoimmune diseases, especially those in which a particular cytokine receptor has a direct role on disease pathogenesis. For example, signaling through the IL-15 receptor is known to be important in the development rheumatoid arthritis, and the receptors for IL-4 and IL-9 play roles in the development of allergic responses.

A selective JAK3 inhibitor, tofacitinib (CP-690550), has been developed and shown promise in clinical trials. This drug has nanomolar potency against JAK3 and was shown to be effective in preventing transplant rejection in a nonhuman primate renal transplant model. Tofacitinib also demonstrated immunosuppressive activity in phase I and II clinical trials of rheumatoid arthritis, psoriasis and organ transplant rejection. Tofacitinib is currently being market by Pfizer as Xeljanz for the treatment of rheumatoid arthritis.

== Interactions ==
Janus kinase 3 has been shown to interact with CD247, TIAF1 and IL2RG.
