= Interleukin 15 receptor, alpha subunit =

Protein-coding gene in the species Homo sapiens

IL15RA
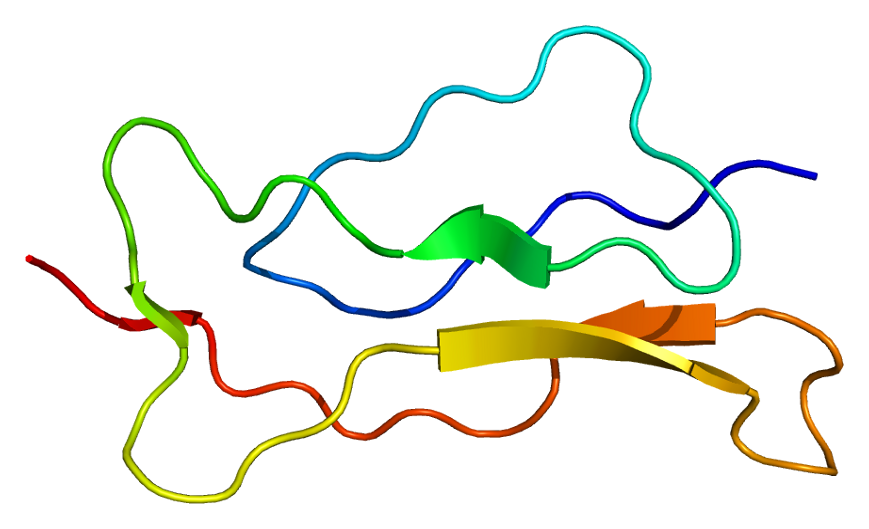

Identifiers
- Aliases: IL15RA, CD215, Interleukin 15 receptor, alpha subunit, interleukin 15 receptor subunit alpha
- External IDs: OMIM: 601070; MGI: 104644; GeneCards: IL15RA
Available structures
PDB	Ortholog search: PDBe RCSB
PDB	List of PDB id codes 2ERS, 2Z3Q, 2Z3R, 4GS7

Gene location (Human)
Chr.	Chromosome 10 (human)
Band	10p15.1	Start	5,943,639 bp
Band	10p15.1	End	5,978,187 bp

Gene location (Mouse)
Chr.	Chromosome 2 (mouse)
Band	2 A1|2 8.97 cM	Start	11,710,101 bp
Band	2 A1|2 8.97 cM	End	11,739,128 bp
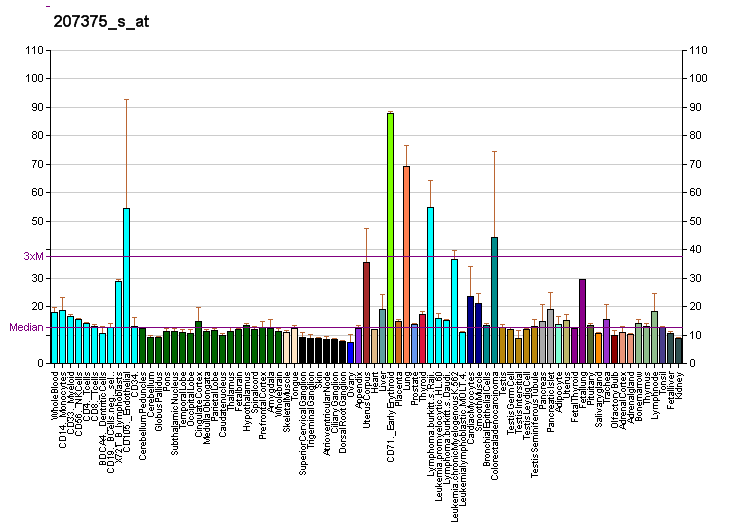
RNA expression pattern
Bgee	Human / Mouse (ortholog); Top expressed in: right lung; upper lobe of left lung; canal of the cervix; gallbladder; ectocervix; gastric mucosa; left uterine tube; apex of heart; body of uterus; right auricle of heart / Top expressed in: muscle of thigh; brown adipose tissue; lactiferous gland; right kidney; extraocular muscle; ankle joint; granulocyte; left lobe of liver; submandibular gland; subcutaneous adipose tissue; More reference expression data
BioGPS	More reference expression data
Gene ontology
Molecular function	cytokine receptor activity; protein binding; signal transducer activity; protein kinase binding; interleukin-15 receptor activity
Cellular component	cytoplasmic vesicle; integral component of membrane; extracellular region; Golgi membrane; Golgi apparatus; nuclear membrane; endoplasmic reticulum membrane; cytoplasmic vesicle membrane; nucleus; endoplasmic reticulum; membrane; plasma membrane; extracellular space; endosome; cell surface
Biological process	cell population proliferation; signal transduction; interleukin-15-mediated signaling pathway; positive regulation of phagocytosis
Sources:Amigo / QuickGO
Orthologs
Databases	NCBI: entry; OMA: entry
Species	Human	Mouse
Entrez	3601	16169
Ensembl	ENSG00000134470	ENSMUSG00000023206
UniProt	Q13261	Q60819
RefSeq (mRNA)	NM_001243539; NM_001256765; NM_002189; NM_172200; NM_001351095 NM_001351096; NM_001351097	NM_001271497; NM_001271498; NM_001271499; NM_001271500; NM_001271501 NM_008358; NM_133836
RefSeq (protein)	NP_001230468; NP_001243694; NP_002180; NP_751950; NP_001338024 NP_001338025; NP_001338026	NP_001258426; NP_001258427; NP_001258428; NP_001258429; NP_001258430 NP_032384; NP_598597
Location (UCSC)	Chr 10: 5.94 – 5.98 Mb	Chr 2: 11.71 – 11.74 Mb
PubMed search
- Wikidata
View/Edit Human	View/Edit Mouse

Interleukin 15 receptor, alpha subunit is a subunit of the interleukin 15 receptor that in humans is encoded by the IL15RA gene.

== Structure ==
The IL-15 receptor is composed of three subunits: IL-15R alpha, CD122, and CD132. Two of these subunits, CD122 and CD132, are shared with the receptor for IL-2, but IL-2 receptor has an additional subunit (CD25). The shared subunits contain the cytoplasmic motifs required for signal transduction, and this forms the basis of many overlapping biological activities of IL15 and IL2, although in vivo the two cytokines have separate biological effects. This may be due to effects of the respective alpha chains, which are unique to each receptor, the kinetics and affinity of cytokine-cytokine receptor binding, or due to the availability and concentration of each cytokine.

== Function ==
IL-15Ralpha specifically binds IL15 with very high affinity, and is capable of binding IL-15 independently of other subunits. It is suggested that this property allows IL-15 to be produced by one cell, endocytosed by another cell, and then presented to a third party cell.

This receptor is reported to enhance cell proliferation and expression of apoptosis inhibitor BCL2L1/BCL2-XL and BCL2. Multiple alternatively spliced transcript variants of this gene have been reported. The full length sequences of only two variants encoding distinct isoforms are available.

== Isoforms ==
Several isoforms of the IL-15Ralpha protein have been detected. These isoforms can either result from alternative splicing of the mRNA encoding for the receptor or by shedding of the extra cellular domain of the receptor protein.
