= T-cell growth factor =

Signaling molecules which stimulate the production and development of T-cells

T-cell growth factors (TCGFs) are signaling molecules collectively called growth factors which stimulate the production and development of T-cells. A number of them have been discovered, among them many members of the interleukin family. The thymus is one organ which releases TCGFs. TCGFs have been able to induce T-cell production outside the body for injection.

== List of TCGFs ==
- IL-2
- IL-7
- IL-9
- IL-15
