= SP4206 =

Identifiers
- IUPAC name: 5-[[2,3-dichloro-4-[5-[1-[2-[[(2R)-2-(diaminomethylideneamino)-4-methylpentanoyl]amino]acetyl]piperidin-4-yl]-1-methylpyrazol-3-yl]phenoxy]methyl]furan-2-carboxylic acid
- CAS Number: 515846-21-6
- PubChem CID: 5288251
- IUPHAR/BPS: 9037
- DrugBank: DB02581
- ChemSpider: 4450452
- ChEBI: CHEBI:47417
- ChEMBL: ChEMBL429852

Chemical and physical data
- Formula: C_{30}H_{37}Cl_{2}N_{7}O_{6}
- Molar mass: 662.57 g·mol^{−1}
- 3D model (JSmol): Interactive image
- SMILES: CC(C)C[C@H](C(=O)NCC(=O)N1CCC(CC1)C2=CC(=NN2C)C3=C(C(=C(C=C3)OCC4=CC=C(O4)C(=O)O)Cl)Cl)N=C(N)N
- InChI: InChI=1S/C30H37Cl2N7O6/c1-16(2)12-21(36-30(33)34)28(41)35-14-25(40)39-10-8-17(9-11-39)22-13-20(37-38(22)3)19-5-7-23(27(32)26(19)31)44-15-18-4-6-24(45-18)29(42)43/h4-7,13,16-17,21H,8-12,14-15H2,1-3H3,(H,35,41)(H,42,43)(H4,33,34,36)/t21-/m1/s1; Key:VNZHOIDQBPFEJU-OAQYLSRUSA-N

SP4206 is an experimental drug which is described as a small molecule protein-protein interaction inhibitor. It binds with high affinity to interleukin-2 at the precise residues which usually mediate binding between interleukin-2 and the IL-2 receptor, thereby preventing binding and blocking the action of interleukin-2 in the body. Interleukin-2 is a cytokine signalling molecule with an important role in the function of the immune system, and most medical interest has been in enhancing interleukin-2 activity for the treatment of cancer. However, it is also involved in some autoimmune disease processes, and blocking interleukin-2 activity with SP4206 has been researched for the treatment of atopic asthma, which is commonly associated with elevated interleukin-2 levels.
