= Common gamma chain =

Protein-coding gene in humans

IL2RG

Identifiers
- Aliases: IL2RG, CD132, CIDX, IL-2RG, IMD4, P64, SCIDX, SCIDX1, interleukin 2 receptor subunit gamma
- External IDs: OMIM: 308380; MGI: 96551; GeneCards: IL2RG
Available structures
PDB	Ortholog search: PDBe RCSB
PDB	List of PDB id codes 2B5I, 2ERJ, 3BPL, 3QAZ, 3QB7, 4GS7

Gene location (Human)
Chr.	X chromosome (human)
Band	Xq13.1	Start	71,107,404 bp
Band	Xq13.1	End	71,112,108 bp

Gene location (Mouse)
Chr.	X chromosome (mouse)
Band	X D|X 43.9 cM	Start	100,307,984 bp
Band	X D|X 43.9 cM	End	100,311,861 bp
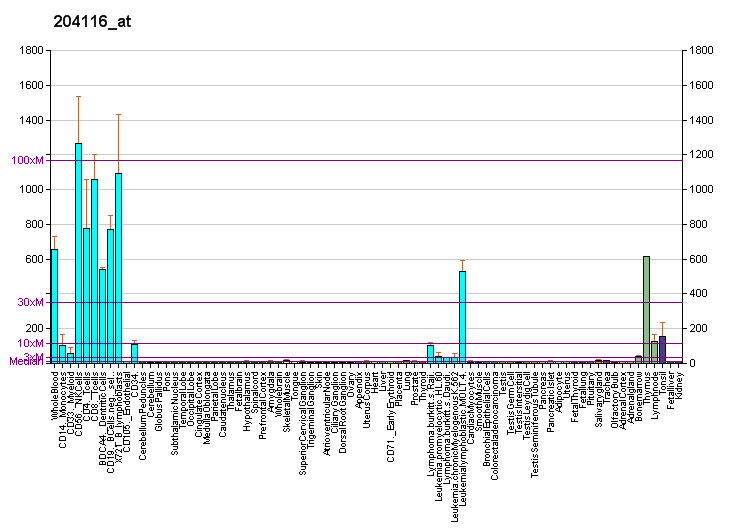
RNA expression pattern
Bgee	Human / Mouse (ortholog); Top expressed in: granulocyte; lymph node; appendix; rectum; thymus; spleen; bone marrow cell; mucosa of ileum; blood; jejunal mucosa / Top expressed in: mesenteric lymph nodes; thymus; spleen; blood; decidua; granulocyte; right lung; right lung lobe; subcutaneous adipose tissue; left lung; More reference expression data
BioGPS	More reference expression data
Gene ontology
Molecular function	interleukin-7 receptor activity; interleukin-2 receptor activity; protein binding; cytokine receptor activity; interleukin-4 receptor activity; interleukin-2 binding; cytokine binding; interleukin-15 receptor activity
Cellular component	integral component of membrane; membrane; plasma membrane; integral component of plasma membrane; external side of plasma membrane; endosome; cytosol; cell surface; receptor complex
Biological process	MAPK cascade; immune response; viral process; signal transduction; interleukin-2-mediated signaling pathway; interleukin-4-mediated signaling pathway; interleukin-7-mediated signaling pathway; interleukin-15-mediated signaling pathway; interleukin-9-mediated signaling pathway; regulation of molecular function; cytokine-mediated signaling pathway; interleukin-21-mediated signaling pathway; positive regulation of phagocytosis
Sources:Amigo / QuickGO
Orthologs
Databases	NCBI: entry; OMA: entry
Species	Human	Mouse
Entrez	3561	16186
Ensembl	ENSG00000147168	ENSMUSG00000031304
UniProt	P31785	P34902
RefSeq (mRNA)	NM_000206	NM_013563; NM_001308535
RefSeq (protein)	NP_000197	NP_001295464; NP_038591
Location (UCSC)	Chr X: 71.11 – 71.11 Mb	Chr X: 100.31 – 100.31 Mb
PubMed search
- Wikidata
View/Edit Human	View/Edit Mouse

The common gamma chain (γ_{c}) (or CD132), also known as interleukin-2 receptor subunit gamma or IL-2RG, is a cytokine receptor sub-unit that is common to the receptor complexes for at least six different interleukin receptors: IL-2, IL-4, IL-7, IL-9, IL-15 and interleukin-21 receptor. The γ_{c} glycoprotein is a member of the type I cytokine receptor family expressed on most lymphocyte (white blood cell) populations, and its gene is found on the X-chromosome of mammals.

This protein is located on the surface of immature blood-forming cells in bone marrow. One end of the protein resides outside the cell where it binds to cytokines and the other end of the protein resides in the interior of the cell where it transmits signals to the cell's nucleus. The common gamma chain partners with other proteins to direct blood-forming cells to form lymphocytes (a type of white blood cell). The receptor also directs the growth and maturation of lymphocyte subtypes: T cells, B cells, innate lymphoid cells, and natural killer cells. These cells kill viruses, make antibodies, and help regulate the entire immune system.

== Gene ==
Cytokine receptor common subunit gamma also known as interleukin-2 receptor subunit gamma or IL-2RG is a protein that in humans is encoded by the IL2RG gene. The human IL2RG gene is located on the long (q) arm of the X chromosome at position 13.1, from base pair 70,110,279 to base pair 70,114,423.

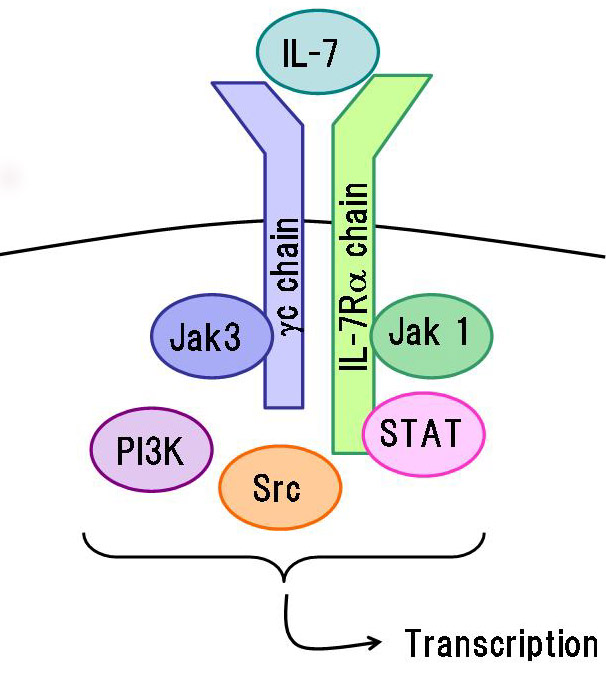
IL-7 receptor and signaling, common γ chain (blue) and IL-7 receptor-α (green)

== Structure ==
The γ_{c} chain is an integral membrane protein that contains extracellular, transmembrane, and intracellular domains.

== Function ==
Lymphocytes expressing the common gamma chain can form functional receptors for these cytokine proteins, which transmit signals from one cell to another and direct programs of cellular differentiation.

=== Ligands ===
The γ_{c} chain partners with other ligand-specific receptors to direct lymphocytes to respond to cytokines including IL-2, IL-4, IL-7, IL-9, IL-15 and IL-21.

=== Signaling ===
IL2RG has been shown to interact with Janus kinase 3.

IL2RG plays a critical role in lymphocyte signal transduction in response to IL-4, IL-7, IL-9, IL-21, IL-15, and IL-2. Once either IL4-Rα, IL-7Rα, IL-9Rα, IL-21Rα, IL-2R or IL-15R has bound to their respective ligands, IL2RG is quickly recruited and forms a heterodimer with the cytoplasmic tail of the opposing receptor. After the heterodimer has formed, IL2RG then activates JAK3, and the opposing receptor activates JAK1. JAK1 and JAK3 then phosphorylate both IL2RG and the opposing receptor's cytoplasmic tail. This phosphorylation allows for IL-2RG and its opposing receptor to recruit a STAT protein. JAK3 and JAK1 subsequently phosphorylate the recruited STAT, allowing the STAT to form a dimer or tetramer with other phosphorylated STAT proteins. Finally, these dimer or STATs translocate to the nucleus, bind STAT motifs within the nuclear DNA, and induce transcription within specific genes.

== Clinical significance ==
=== X-linked severe combined immunodeficiency ===
X-linked severe combined immunodeficiency is caused by mutations in the IL2RG gene. More than 200 different mutations in the IL2RG gene have been identified in people with X-linked severe combined immunodeficiency (SCID). Most of these mutations involve changes in one or a few nucleotides (DNA building blocks) in the gene. These changes lead to the production of a nonfunctional version of the common gamma chain protein or no production of protein. Without the common gamma chain, important chemical signals are not relayed to the nucleus and lymphocytes cannot develop normally. A lack of functional mature lymphocytes disrupts the immune system's ability to protect the body from infection. Affected people have no functional immunity and can die within months after birth without successful bone marrow transplantation or alternatively, isolation from exposure to pathogens. Without important developmental signals from IL-7 and IL-15, T-cell and NK cell populations respectively fail to develop.

Experiments in animal models have shown X-SCID to occur similarly in dogs, but not in mice.

=== Schizophrenia ===
Alterations in the immune response are involved in pathogenesis of many neuropsychiatric disorders including schizophrenia. Distinct gene variants of a number of pro-inflammatory and chemotactic cytokines together with their receptors associate with this disorder. IL2RG represents an important signaling component of many interleukin receptors and so far, no data on the functional state of this receptor in schizophrenia have been reported. Over-expression of the IL2RG gene may be implicated in altered immune response in schizophrenia and contribute to the pathogenesis of this disorder.
