= Interleukin 15-like =

Cytokine

Interleukin 15-like (IL-15L) is an interleukin, a type of cytokine signaling in the immune system. It is a secreted protein of approximately 120 amino acids and related to IL-2 and IL-15.

Intact IL-15L genes are found in bony fish, cartilaginous fish, reptiles, and many mammals. However, in humans and mice only an IL-15L pseudogene is found. The location of the IL-15L gene in the genome is conserved from sharks to mammals and on a different chromosome than IL-2 and IL-15.

Bony fish (trout) IL-15L specifically stimulates the expression of type 2 immunity cytokines IL-4/13A and IL-4/13B (homologs of IL-4 and IL-13.), probably by stimulating ILC2 cells; this is quite different from the functions found for IL-2 and IL-15, including in fish. For mammalian IL-15L, a function has not been found yet. In both fish and mammals, IL-15L seems to be quite dependent for its stability on "heterodimer" formation with IL-15Rα, and functions for fish IL-15L could only be found if partnered with (presented "in trans" by) IL-15Rα

It is unclear why many mammals, and also birds and amphibians, lost IL-15L. It has been postulated that in fish the IL-15L cytokine resides at the beginning of a type 2 immune cascade, a function that in mammals is performed by cytokines such as TSLP, IL-25, and IL-33; none of these three cytokines have been found in fish, and their evolution in tetrapod species may have made IL-15L redundant.
