= IL-9 =

IL-9 can refer to:

- Interleukin 9
- Illinois' 9th congressional district
- Illinois Route 9
