= Interleukin 15 =

Cytokine with structural similarity to Interleukin-2

IL15
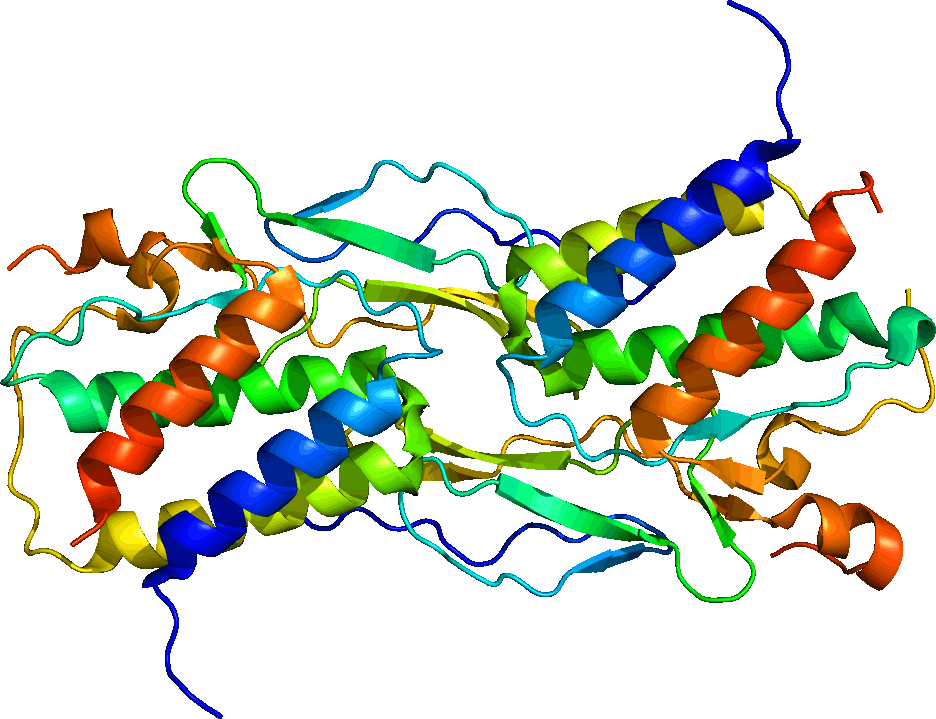

Identifiers
- Aliases: IL15, IL-15, interleukin 15
- External IDs: OMIM: 600554; MGI: 103014; GeneCards: IL15
Available structures
PDB	Ortholog search: PDBe RCSB
PDB	List of PDB id codes 2XQB, 2Z3Q, 2Z3R, 4GS7

Gene location (Human)
Chr.	Chromosome 4 (human)
Band	4q31.21	Start	141,636,583 bp
Band	4q31.21	End	141,733,987 bp

Gene location (Mouse)
Chr.	Chromosome 8 (mouse)
Band	8 C2|8 39.33 cM	Start	83,058,261 bp
Band	8 C2|8 39.33 cM	End	83,129,851 bp
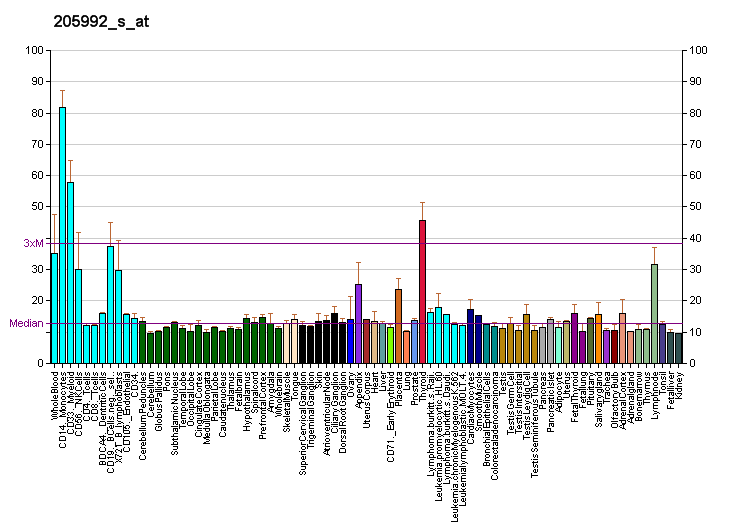

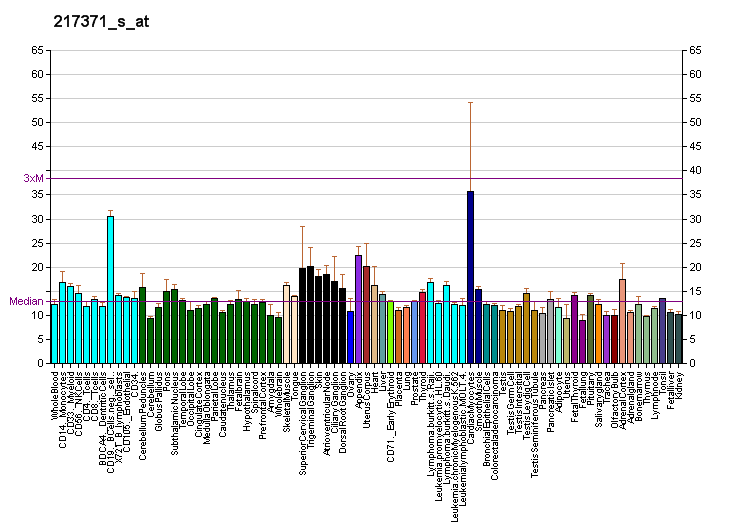
RNA expression pattern
Bgee	Human / Mouse (ortholog); Top expressed in: decidua; monocyte; stromal cell of endometrium; left lobe of thyroid gland; granulocyte; right lobe of thyroid gland; spleen; Descending thoracic aorta; gastric mucosa; ascending aorta / Top expressed in: granulocyte; right ventricle; cardiac muscles; right kidney; myocardium of ventricle; embryo; duodenum; cardiac muscle tissue of left ventricle; proximal tubule; seminal vesicula; More reference expression data
BioGPS	More reference expression data
Gene ontology
Molecular function	protein binding; cytokine receptor binding; cytokine activity
Cellular component	nucleus; integral component of plasma membrane; Golgi apparatus; endosome; nucleoplasm; membrane; cell surface; extracellular region; extracellular space; cytoplasm; cytosol; nuclear speck
Biological process	negative regulation of smooth muscle cell proliferation; cell maturation; extrathymic T cell selection; positive regulation of T cell proliferation; regulation of defense response to virus by host; positive regulation of inflammatory response; response to nutrient levels; positive regulation of protein O-linked glycosylation; positive regulation of interleukin-17 production; hyaluronan metabolic process; positive regulation of natural killer cell differentiation; regulation of T cell differentiation; positive regulation of tissue remodeling; cellular response to vitamin D; lymph node development; natural killer cell differentiation; positive regulation of natural killer cell proliferation; cell-cell signaling; skeletal muscle atrophy; signal transduction; ageing; NK T cell proliferation; positive regulation of immune response; inflammatory response; immune response; positive regulation of cell population proliferation; tyrosine phosphorylation of STAT protein; positive regulation of tyrosine phosphorylation of STAT protein; regulation of signaling receptor activity; interleukin-15-mediated signaling pathway; neutrophil activation; positive regulation of peptidyl-tyrosine phosphorylation; positive regulation of phagocytosis; negative regulation of cold-induced thermogenesis; macrophage differentiation
Sources:Amigo / QuickGO
Orthologs
Databases	NCBI: entry; OMA: entry
Species	Human	Mouse
Entrez	3600	16168
Ensembl	ENSG00000164136	ENSMUSG00000031712
UniProt	P40933	P48346
RefSeq (mRNA)	NM_000585; NM_172174; NM_172175	NM_001254747; NM_008357
RefSeq (protein)	NP_000576; NP_751915	NP_001241676; NP_032383
Location (UCSC)	Chr 4: 141.64 – 141.73 Mb	Chr 8: 83.06 – 83.13 Mb
PubMed search
- Wikidata
View/Edit Human	View/Edit Mouse

Interleukin-15 (IL-15) is a protein that in humans is encoded by the IL15 gene. IL-15 is an inflammatory cytokine with structural similarity to Interleukin-2 (IL-2). Like IL-2, IL-15 binds to and signals through a complex composed of IL-2/IL-15 receptor beta chain (CD122) and the common gamma chain (gamma-C, CD132). IL-15 is secreted by mononuclear phagocytes (and some other cells) following infection by virus(es). This cytokine induces the proliferation of natural killer cells, i.e. cells of the innate immune system whose principal role is to kill virally infected cells.

== Expression ==
IL-15 was discovered in 1994 by two different laboratories, and characterized as T cell growth factor. Together with Interleukin-2 (IL-2), Interleukin-4 (IL-4), Interleukin-7 (IL-7), Interleukin-9 (IL-9), granulocyte colony-stimulating factor (G-CSF), and granulocyte-macrophage colony-stimulating factor (GM-CSF), IL-15 belongs to the four α-helix bundle family of cytokines.

IL-15 is constitutively expressed by a large number of cell types and tissues, including monocytes, macrophages, dendritic cells (DC), keratinocytes, fibroblasts, myocytes, nerve cells and mesenchymal stem cells. As a pleiotropic cytokine, it plays an important role in innate and adaptive immunity.

== Gene ==
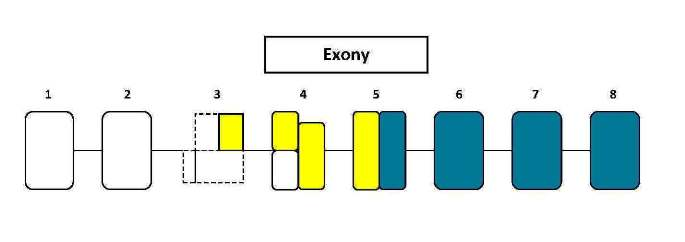
Figure 1. IL-15 is 14–15 kDa glycoprotein encoded by the 34 kb region on chromosome 4q31, and by central region of chromosome 8 in mice. The human IL-15 gene comprises nine exons (1–8 and 4A) and eight introns, four of which (exons 5 through 8) code for the mature protein.

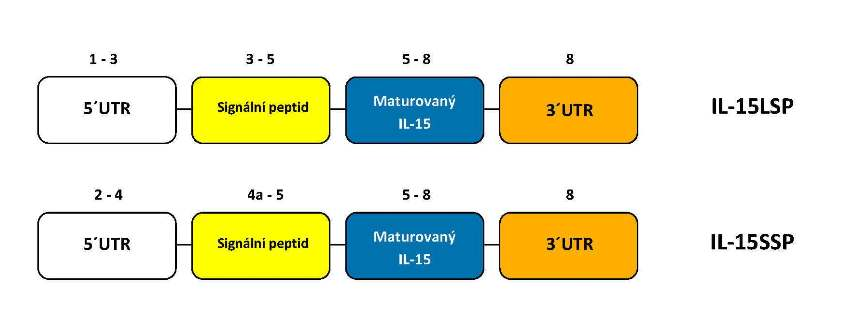
Figure 2. The originally identified isoform, with long signal peptide of 48 amino acids (IL-15 LSP) consisted of a 316 bp 5'-untraslated region (UTR), 486 bp coding sequence and on the C-terminus 400 bp 3'-UTR region. The other isoform (IL-15 SSP) has a short signal peptide of 21 amino acids encoded by exons 4A and 5. Both isoforms shared 11 amino acids between signal sequences of the leader peptides.

IL-15 is 14–15 kDa glycoprotein encoded by the 34 kb region of chromosome 4q31 in humans, and at the central region of chromosome 8 in mice. The human IL-15 gene comprises nine exons (1–8 and 4A) and eight introns, four of which (exons 5 through 8) code for the mature protein (Figure 1).

Two alternatively spliced transcript variants of this gene encoding the same protein have been reported. The originally identified isoform, with long signal peptide of 48 amino acids (IL-15 LSP) consisted of a 316 bp 5'-untranslated region (UTR), 486 bp coding sequence and the C-terminus 400 bp 3'-UTR region. The other isoform (IL-15 SSP) has a short signal peptide of 21 amino acids encoded by exons 4A and 5. Both isoforms shared 11 amino acids between signal sequences of the N-terminus. Although both isoforms produce the same mature protein, they differ in their cellular trafficking. IL-15 LSP isoform was identified in Golgi apparatus [GC], early endosomes and in the endoplasmic reticulum (ER). It exists in two forms, secreted and membrane-bound particularly on dendritic cells. On the other hand, IL-15 SSP isoform is not secreted and it appears to be restricted to the cytoplasm and nucleus where plays an important role in the regulation of cell cycle.

It has been demonstrated that two isoforms of IL-15 mRNA are generated by alternative splicing in mice. The isoform which had an alternative exon 5 containing another 3' splicing site, exhibited a high translational efficiency, and the product lack hydrophobic domains in the signal sequence of the N-terminus. This suggests that the protein derived from this isoform is located intracellulary. The other isoform with normal exon 5, which is generated by integral splicing of the alternative exon 5, may be released extracellulary.

Although IL-15 mRNA can be found in many cells and tissues including mast cells, cancer cells or fibroblasts, this cytokine is produced as a mature protein mainly by dendritic cells, monocytes and macrophages. This discrepancy between the wide appearance of IL-15 mRNA and limited production of protein might be explained by the presence of the twelve in humans and five in mice upstream initiating codons, which can repress translation of IL-15 mRNA. Translational inactive mRNA is stored within the cell and can be induced upon specific signal. Expression of IL-15 can be stimulated by cytokine such as GM-CSF, double-strand mRNA, unmethylated CpG oligonucleotides, lipopolysaccharide (LPS) through Toll-like receptors (TLR), interferon gamma (IFN-γ) or after infection of monocytes herpes virus, Mycobacterium tuberculosis and Candida albicans (Figure 2).

== Signaling ==
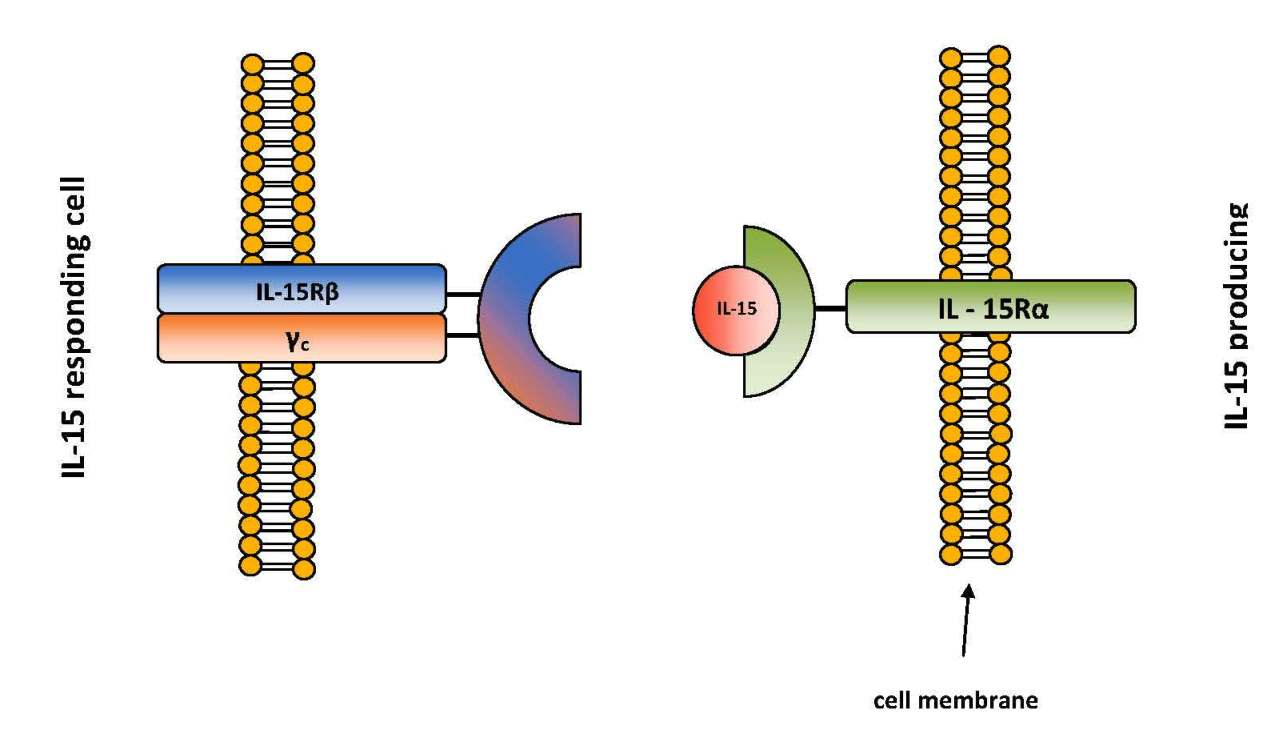
Figure 3. The main mechanism of IL-15 signaling is trans-presentation which is mediated by membrane-bound complex IL-15/IL-15Rα. Signaling pathway of IL-15 begins with binding to IL-15Rα receptor, with subsequent presentation to surrounding cells bearing IL-15Rβγc complex on their cell surface.

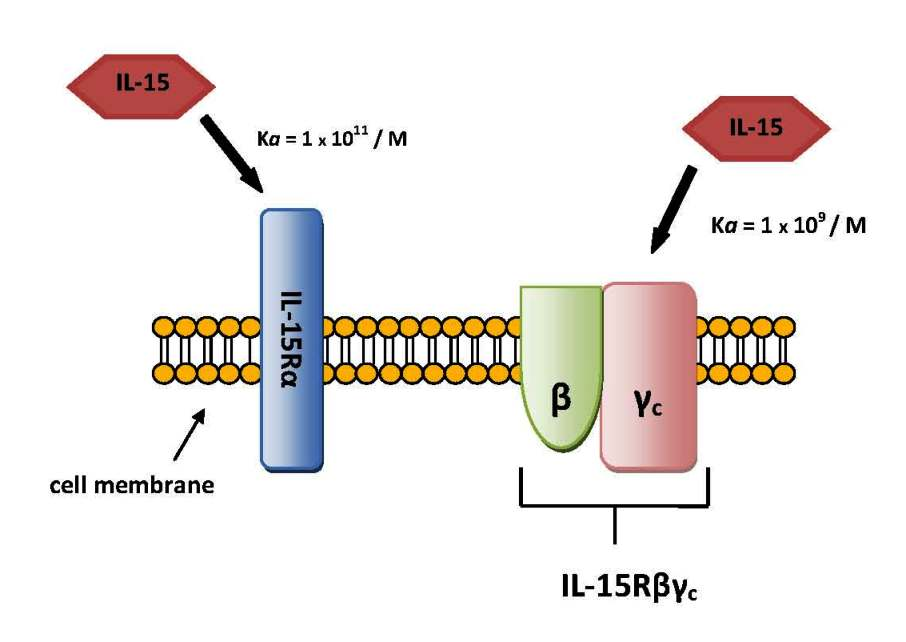
Figure 4. IL-15 bind to IL-15Rα receptor alone with affinity (K_{a} = 1.10^{11}/M). It can also bind to IL-15Rβγc signaling complex with lower affinity (Ka = 1.10^{9}/M).

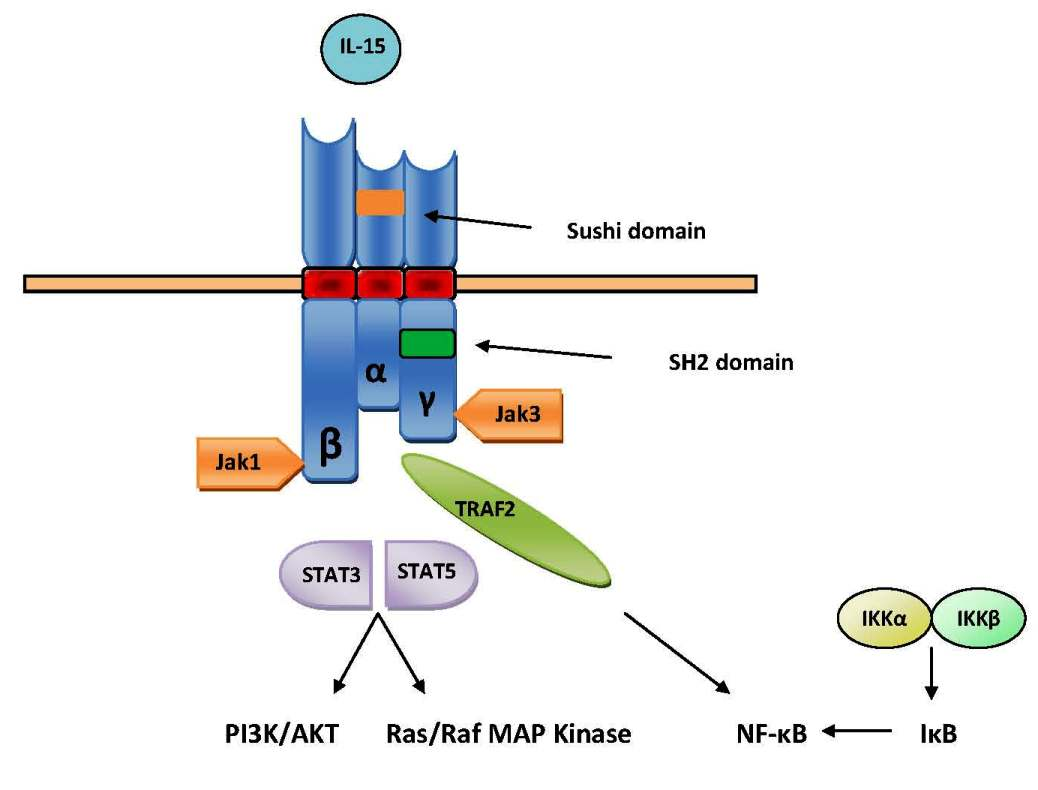
Figure 5. Signaling pathway of IL-15 begins with binding to IL-15Rα receptor, with subsequent presentation to surrounding cells bearing IL-15Rβγc complex on their cell surface. Upon binding IL-15β subunit activates Janus kinase 1 (Jak1) and γc subunit Janus kinase 3 (Jak3), which leads to phosphorylation and activation of signal transducer and activator of transcription 3 (STAT3) and STAT5. Due to sharing of receptor subunits between IL-2 and IL-15, both of these cytokines have similar downstream effects including the induction of B-cell lymphoma (Bcl-2), MAP (mitogen-activated protein kinase) kinase pathway and the phosphorylation of Lck (lymphocyte-activated protein tyrosine kinase) and Syk (spleen tyrosine kinase) kinases, which leads to cell proliferation and maturation.

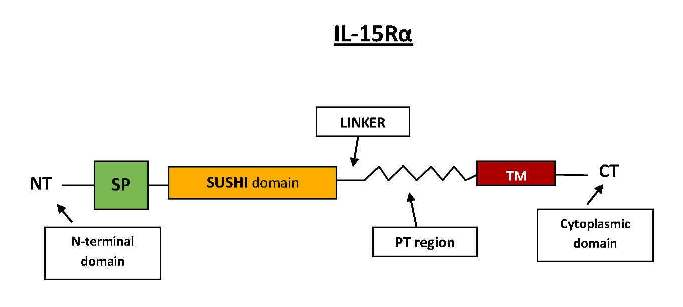
Figure 6. The second mechanism of IL-15 action is cis-presentation, when IL-15 is presented by IL-15Rα to 15Rβγc signaling complex on the same cell. This mechanism is mediated by the C-terminus flexibility which is mediated by 32 amino acids linker and/or 74 amino acids long PT region.

The prevailing mechanism of IL-15 action seems to be juxtacrine signaling or also determined as cell-to-cell contact. It also includes intracrine and reverse signaling. IL-15 was initially characterized as a soluble molecule. Later it was shown that IL-15 also exists as a membrane-bound form which represents the major form of IL-15 protein. In membrane-bound form it could be bound directly to cellular membrane or presented by IL-15Rα receptor.

The main mechanism of IL-15 signaling is trans-presentation which is mediated by membrane-bound complex IL-15/IL-15Rα (Figure 3). IL-15 bind to IL-15Rα receptor alone with an affinity of K_{a} = 1.10^{11}/M. It can also bind to IL-15Rβγ_{c} signaling complex with lower affinity (K_{a} = 1.10^{9}/M) (Figure 4).

Signaling pathway of IL-15 begins with binding to IL-15Rα receptor, with subsequent presentation to surrounding cells bearing IL-15Rβγc complex on their cell surface. Upon binding IL-15β subunit activates Janus kinase 1 (Jak1) and γc subunit Janus kinase 3 (Jak3), which leads to phosphorylation and activation of signal transducer and activator of transcription 3 (STAT3) and STAT5. Due to sharing of receptor subunits between IL-2 and IL-15, both of these cytokines have similar downstream effects including the induction of Bcl-2, MAP (mitogen-activated protein kinase) kinase pathway and the phosphorylation of Lck (lymphocyte-activated protein tyrosine kinase) and Syk (spleen tyrosine kinase) kinases, which leads to cell proliferation and maturation (Figure 5).

In mast cells, the IL-15R signaling pathway has been found to include Jak2 and STAT5 instead Jak1/3 and STAT3/5. Phosphorylation STATs form transcription factors and activate transcription of appropriate genes. The β chain of IL-15R recruits and also activates protein tyrosine kinases of the Src family including Lck, Fyn and Lyn kinase. It also activates phosphatidylinositol 3-kinase (PI3K) and AKT signaling pathway and induce expression of transcription factors including c-Fos, c-Jun, c-Myc and NF-κB.

IL-15 is also able to bind to the 15Rβγ_{c} signaling complex with intermediate affinity without requirement for IL-15Rα receptor. Upon binding IL-15 to signaling complex, kinases of the Src family including Lck and Fyn are activated, and subsequently activates PI3K and MAPK signaling pathway. The second mechanism of IL-15 action is cis-presentation, when IL-15 is presented by IL-15Rα to 15Rβγ_{c} signaling complex on the same cell. This mechanism is mediated by the C-terminus flexibility which is mediated by 32 amino acids linker and/or 74 amino acids long PT region (Figure 6).

== Function ==
IL-15 regulates the activation and proliferation of T and natural killer (NK) cells. Survival signals that maintain memory T cells in the absence of antigen are provided by IL-15. This cytokine is also implicated in NK cell development. In rodent lymphocytes, IL-15 prevents apoptosis by inducing BCL2L1/BCL-x(L), an inhibitor of the apoptosis pathway. In humans with celiac disease IL-15 similarly suppresses apoptosis in T-lymphocytes by inducing Bcl-2 and/or Bcl-xL.

A hematopoietin receptor, the IL-15 receptor, that binds IL-15 propagates its function. Some subunits of the IL-15 receptor are shared in common with the receptor for a structurally related cytokine called Interleukin 2 (IL-2) allowing both cytokines to compete for and negatively regulate each other's activity. CD8+ memory T cell number is controlled by a balance between IL-15 and IL-2. When IL-15 binds its receptor, JAK kinase, STAT3, STAT5, and STAT6 transcription factors are activated to elicit downstream signaling events.

IL-15 and its receptor subunit alpha (IL-15Rα) are also produced by skeletal muscle in response to different exercise doses (myokine), playing significant roles in visceral (intra-abdominal or interstitial) fat reduction and myofibrillar protein synthesis (hypertrophy).

== Evolution ==
All classes of jawed vertebrates, including sharks, share an IL-15 gene at a conserved genomic location. Unusual features of IL-15 that appear to be conserved throughout jawed vertebrate evolution are (1) multiple AUGs in the transcript 5' untranslated region, (2) an unusually long N-terminal hydrophobic (leader) sequence, and (3) a dependency on the formation of what might be considered "heterodimer cytokine" complexes with IL-15Rα for stability. The latter probably helps to retain IL-15 activity at the surface of the expressing cell and therefore within restricted tissue niches, while the reasons for (1) and (2) are still not known. In fish, the gene duplication resulting in mammalian IL-2Rα and IL-15Rα has not occurred yet, and the molecules IL-2, IL-15, and IL-15-like (IL-15L) all share the same receptor alpha chain which looks like mammalian IL-15Rα. In fish, as in mammals, IL-15 appears to stimulate type 1 (Th1) immunity.

In jawless fish or invertebrates, homologues of IL-15 have not been found.

== Disease ==
=== Epstein–Barr virus ===
In humans with history of acute infectious mononucleosis (the syndrome associated with primary Epstein–Barr virus infection), IL-15R expressing lymphocytes are not detected even 14 years after infection.

=== Celiac disease ===
There have been recent studies suggesting that suppression of IL-15 may be a potential treatment for celiac disease and even presents the possibility of preventing its development. In one study with mice blocking IL-15 with an antibody led to the reversal of autoimmune intestinal damage. In another study mice used were able to eat gluten without developing symptoms.

=== Non-alcoholic fatty liver disease ===
A recent report indicated IL-15 promotes non-alcoholic fatty liver disease.

=== Rheumatoid arthritis ===
A recent study found IL-15 present in the synovial tissue of patients diagnosed with rheumatoid arthritis. Preliminary research has functionally implicated IL-15 role in collagen-induced arthritis.

== Immunotherapy ==
=== Metastatic cancer ===
IL-15 has been shown to enhance the anti-tumor immunity of CD8+ T cells in pre-clinical models. A phase I clinical trial to evaluate the safety, dosing, and anti-tumor efficacy of IL-15 in patients with metastatic melanoma and renal cell carcinoma (kidney cancer) has begun to enroll patients at the National Institutes of Health.

=== Vaccines Adjuvants ===
Vector-based therapy – Nonlytic Newcastle Disease Virus (NDV) was engineered to express recombinant IL-15 protein to generate an NDV-modified tumor vaccine. Preclinical results of NDV-modified tumor vaccine showed promise by controlling melanoma tumor growth in mice. A recombinant vaccinia virus expressing influenza A proteins and IL-15 promoted cross protection by CD4+ T cells. A Brucella DNA vaccine containing IL-15 gene enhanced the CD8+ T cell immune response in mice. IL-15 was needed for CD4+ T cell heterosubtypic protection while using a multivalent influenza vaccine using vaccinia-based vector. While influenza A virus expressing IL-15 stimulates both innate and adaptive immune cells to decrease tumor growth mice.

=== Transpresentation complexes ===
Currently there are two varieties of IL-15 superagonist available. One combines IL-15 and IL-15Rα-Fc (R&D Systems) in vitro to generate the complex. It is referred to as IL-15 SA. A second IL-15 superagonist complex called ALT-803 is offered by Altor BioScience.

==== IL-15 SA ====
IL-15 SA is currently being evaluated for antiviral and anticancer activities, in addition to enhancing immunotherapy and vaccination. One potential shortcoming of IL-15 SA was its enhancement of septic shock in mice.

==== Nogapendekin alfa inbakicept ====
Nogapendekin alfa inbakicept (ALT-803) is an IL-15 superagonist complex IL-15N72D:IL-15RαSu/Fc that includes an IL-15 mutant (IL-15N72D) and a dimeric IL-15 receptor α sushi domain-IgG1 Fc fusion protein.

ALT-803 was given fast track status by the FDA in 2017 and at that time, Phase III trials in bladder cancer were being prepared.

==== Nanrilkefusp alfa ====
Nanrilkefusp alfa (RLI-15) is a fusion protein consisting of the NH_{2}-terminal (amino acids 1–77, sushi+) cytokine-binding domain of IL-15Rα coupled to IL-15 via a 20-amino acid flexible linker. This fusion protein, referred to as protein receptor-linker-IL-15 (RLI-15) acts as an IL-15 superagonists specifically binding with high affinity the mid-affinity IL-2/IL-15 receptor formed by IL2RB and the Common gamma chain (γ_{c} or CD132), that has an increased serum half-life and biological activity similar to complexed IL-15/IL-15Rα-Fc. RLI-15 demonstrated a strong anti-tumor effect in two different tumor models. RLI-15 is being produced and tested by Cytune Pharma affiliated company of SOTIO which renamed it to SO-C101, later to SOT101. Phase 1 trial was initiated in 2019.

==== Rheumatoid arthritis ====
Possible implications of IL-15 treatment for individuals diagnosed with rheumatoid arthritis (RA). HuMax-IL15 was derived from transgenic mice and individuals with RA underwent HuMax-IL15 administration for twelve weeks. After treating synovial tissue with HuMax-IL15, decreased proliferation of interferon-y and suppressed expression of CD69 was observed. Additionally, 63% of patients reported a 20% improvement while 25% of patients reported a 70% improvement. American College of Rheumatology criteria were used to determine the severity of RA symptoms.
