= Interleukin-21 receptor =

Protein-coding gene in the species Homo sapiens

IL21R

Identifiers
- Aliases: IL21R, CD360, NILR, interleukin 21 receptor, IMD56
- External IDs: OMIM: 605383; MGI: 1890475; GeneCards: IL21R
Available structures
PDB	Ortholog search: PDBe RCSB
PDB	List of PDB id codes 3TGX, 4NZD

Gene location (Human)
Chr.	Chromosome 16 (human)
Band	16p12.1	Start	27,402,174 bp
Band	16p12.1	End	27,452,042 bp

Gene location (Mouse)
Chr.	Chromosome 7 (mouse)
Band	7|7 F3	Start	125,202,601 bp
Band	7|7 F3	End	125,232,742 bp
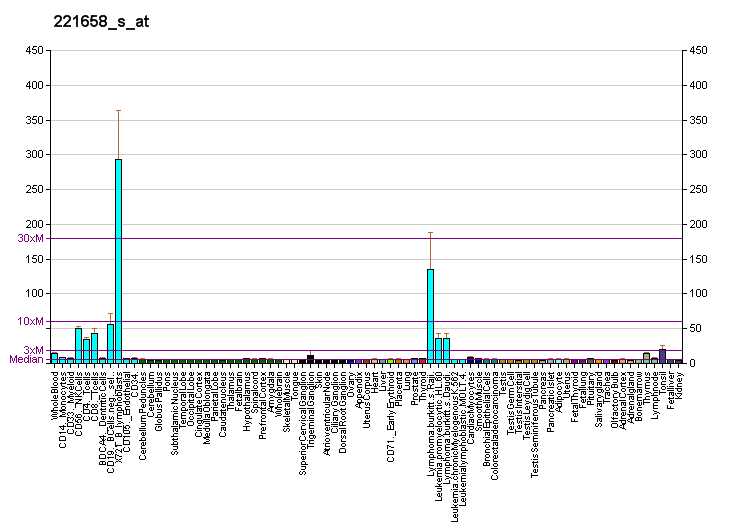

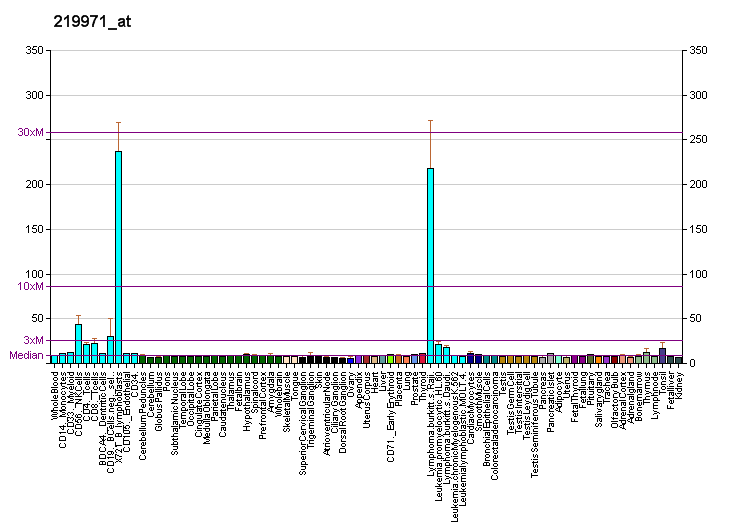
RNA expression pattern
Bgee	Human / Mouse (ortholog); Top expressed in: granulocyte; lymph node; blood; appendix; epithelium of nasopharynx; tonsil; spleen; bone marrow; bone marrow cell; superficial temporal artery / Top expressed in: thymus; mesenteric lymph nodes; spleen; subcutaneous adipose tissue; stroma of bone marrow; granulocyte; ascending aorta; blood; aortic valve; mandible; More reference expression data
BioGPS	More reference expression data
Gene ontology
Molecular function	cytokine receptor activity; interleukin-21 receptor activity; transmembrane signaling receptor activity
Cellular component	integral component of membrane; membrane; plasma membrane
Biological process	natural killer cell activation; interleukin-21-mediated signaling pathway
Sources:Amigo / QuickGO
Orthologs
Databases	NCBI: entry; OMA: entry
Species	Human	Mouse
Entrez	50615	60504
Ensembl	ENSG00000103522	ENSMUSG00000030745
UniProt	Q9HBE5	Q9JHX3
RefSeq (mRNA)	NM_021798; NM_181078; NM_181079	NM_021887
RefSeq (protein)	NP_068570; NP_851564; NP_851565	NP_068687
Location (UCSC)	Chr 16: 27.4 – 27.45 Mb	Chr 7: 125.2 – 125.23 Mb
PubMed search
- Wikidata
View/Edit Human	View/Edit Mouse

Interleukin 21 receptor is a type I cytokine receptor. IL21R is its human gene.

The protein encoded by this gene is a cytokine receptor for interleukin 21 (IL21). It belongs to the type I cytokine receptors, and has been shown to form a heterodimeric receptor complex with the common gamma chain (γc), a receptor subunit also shared by the receptors for interleukin 2 (IL2), interleukin 7 (IL7) and interleukin 15 (IL15). This receptor transduces the growth promoting signal of IL21, and is important for the proliferation and differentiation of T cells, B cells, and natural killer (NK) cells. The ligand binding of this receptor leads to the activation of multiple downstream signaling molecules, including JAK1, JAK3, STAT1, and STAT3. Knockout studies of a similar gene in mouse suggest a role for this gene in regulating immunoglobulin production. Three alternatively spliced transcript variants encoding the same protein have been described.
