= Interleukin-15 receptor =

Protein complex

interleukin 15 receptor, alpha
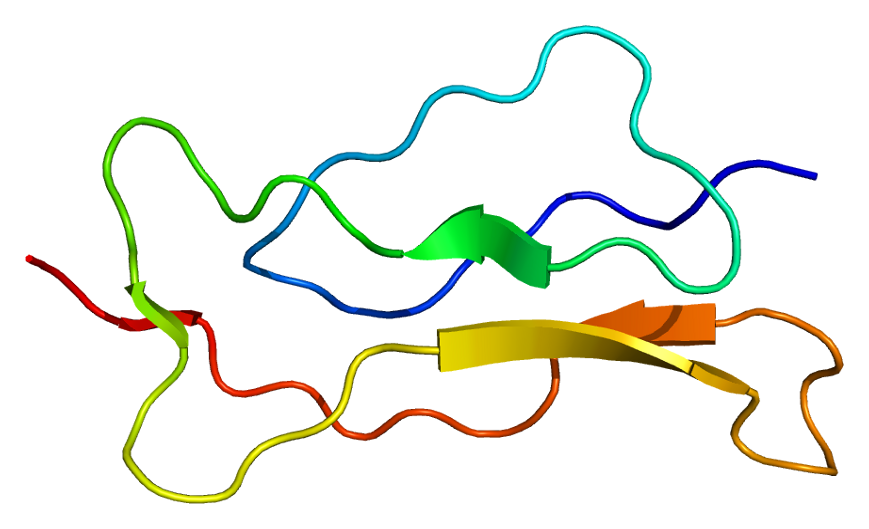
- PDB rendering based on 2ers.

Identifiers
- Symbol: IL15RA
- NCBI gene: 3601
- HGNC: 5978
- OMIM: 601070
- RefSeq: NM_172200
- UniProt: Q13261

Other data
- Locus: Chr. 10 p15-10p14
Search for
- Structures: Swiss-model
- Domains: InterPro

interleukin 2 receptor, beta
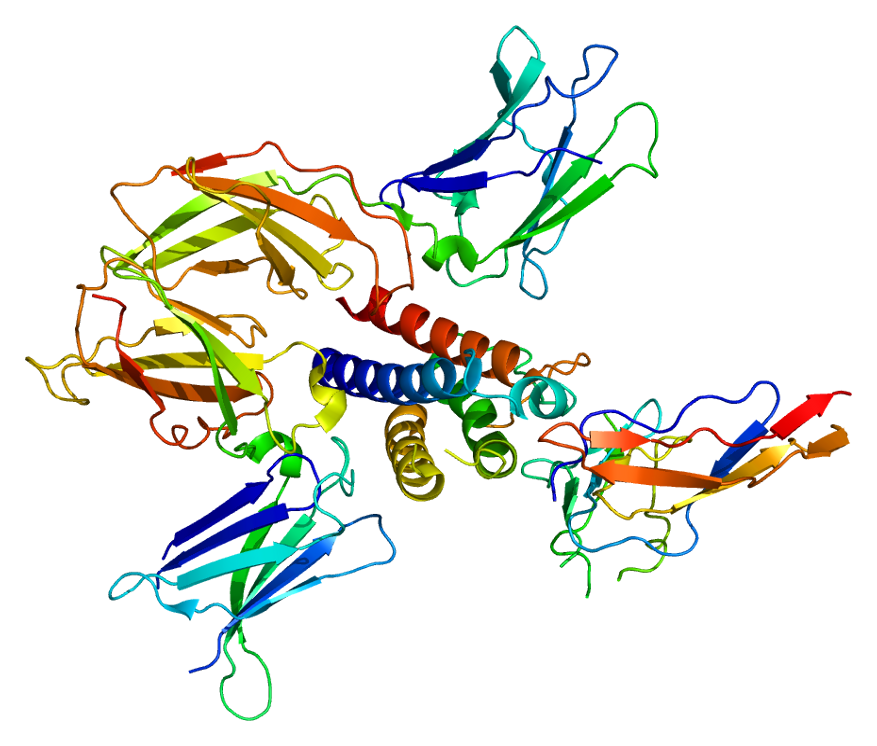
- PDB rendering based on 2b5i.

Identifiers
- Symbol: IL2RB
- Alt. symbols: CD122
- NCBI gene: 3560
- HGNC: 6009
- OMIM: 146710
- RefSeq: NM_000878
- UniProt: P14784

Other data
- Locus: Chr. 22 q13
Search for
- Structures: Swiss-model
- Domains: InterPro

interleukin 2 receptor, gamma (severe combined immunodeficiency)
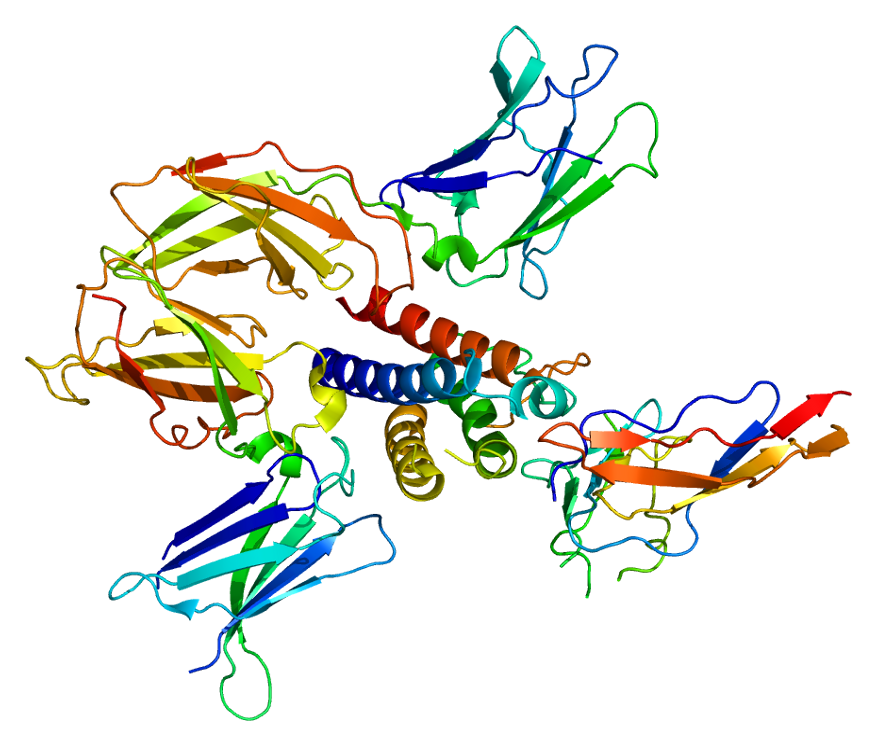
- Crystallographic structure of IL-2 (center alpha helices) complexed with the common gamma chain (IL2RG; 10 O'Clock to 1 O'Clock), IL2RA (4 O'Clock), and IL2RB (7 O'Clock to 9 O'Clock). Each protein is individually rainbow colored (N-terminus = blue, C-terminus = red).

Identifiers
- Symbol: IL2RG
- Alt. symbols: SCIDX1, IMD4
- NCBI gene: 3561
- HGNC: 6010
- OMIM: 308380
- RefSeq: NM_000206

Other data
- Locus: Chr. X q13

Interleukin-15 receptor is a type I cytokine receptor, binding interleukin-15.

== Structure ==
The IL-15 receptor is composed of the IL-2Rβ and γc subunits, along with a unique ligand-specific subunit, IL-15Rα, which bears homology to IL-2Rα. These receptor proteins feature protein-binding motifs known as "sushi domains." In both humans and mice, these receptors and their corresponding ligands are physically linked in the genome. Due to their shared receptor usage, IL-2 and IL-15 exhibit many similarities in their effects on lymphoid cells.

Although the receptors for IL-2 and IL-15 share many structural analogies, two significant differences persist: Firstly, IL-15Rα has a broader expression compared to IL-2Rα, IL-2Rβ, and γc. It is found on lymphoid cells, dendritic cells (DCs), fibroblasts, epithelial cells, liver cells, intestinal cells and other cells and is thought to present IL-15 in trans to cells expressing IL-15β and γ chains. Secondly, IL-15Rα exhibits a remarkably high affinity for binding to IL-15, over 1000 times greater than the affinity of IL-2Rα binding to IL-2.

== Signaling ==
IL-15-mediated signaling in T lymphocytes leads to the activation of Janus kinase (JAK). JAKs play crucial signaling roles for several members of the cytokine receptor superfamily by activating signal transducer and activator of transcription (STAT) proteins. In lymphocytes, binding of IL-15 to the IL-2/15Rβγ heterodimer induces JAK1 activation that subsequently phosphorylates STAT3 via the β chain and JAK3/STAT5 activation via its γ chain. Once tyrosine-phosphorylated, STAT transcription factors form homo- and/or heterodimers and migrate to the nucleus. There, they bind to target DNA regulatory elements and contribute to the activation of gene expression.

IL-15 also trigger other signaling pathways, including the phosphorylation of cytoplasmic tyrosine kinases from the Src family such as Lck, Fyn, and Lyn, along with Syk kinase. They also activate phosphatidylinositol 3 kinase (PI3-kinase) and Akt, leading to the induction of the anti-apoptotic protein Bcl-2. Additionally, they stimulate the Ras/Raf/MEK/mitogen-activated protein kinase (MAPK) pathway.

== Function ==
The signaling pathway of the IL-15/IL-15R system is now understood to affect not only T-cell functions but also various other cell populations. Several recent reviews have extensively explored the functional significance of IL-15/IL-15R biology in T lymphocyte development and homeostasis, as well as in the development, maintenance, expansion, and activities of memory CD8+ T cells and NK cells.

One of the most defining functional differences between IL-2 and IL-15 is that IL-15 is increasingly acknowledged as a significant modulator of various non-immune cell types, whereas the functions of IL-2 are predominantly restricted to T cells.
