= ELP2 =

Protein-coding gene in the species Homo sapiens

Identifiers
- Aliases: ELP2, SHINC-2, STATIP1, StIP, elongator acetyltransferase complex subunit 2, MRT58
- External IDs: OMIM: 616054; MGI: 1889642; GeneCards: ELP2

Gene location (Human)
Chr.	Chromosome 18 (human)
Band	18q12.2	Start	36,129,444 bp
Band	18q12.2	End	36,180,557 bp

Gene location (Mouse)
Chr.	Chromosome 18 (mouse)
Band	18|18 A2	Start	24,735,923 bp
Band	18|18 A2	End	24,772,564 bp
RNA expression pattern
Bgee	Human / Mouse (ortholog); Top expressed in: left ovary; Achilles tendon; right ovary; skin of abdomen; ganglionic eminence; skin of leg; epithelium of colon; right uterine tube; body of pancreas; canal of the cervix / Top expressed in: saccule; otic placode; motor neuron; facial motor nucleus; internal carotid artery; condyle; external carotid artery; primitive streak; utricle; fossa; More reference expression data
BioGPS	n/a
Gene ontology
Molecular function	RNA polymerase II complex binding; protein kinase binding
Cellular component	histone acetyltransferase complex; transcription elongation factor complex; nucleus; cytoplasm; cytosol; elongator holoenzyme complex
Biological process	regulation of transcription by RNA polymerase II; transcription elongation from RNA polymerase II promoter; regulation of transcription, DNA-templated; transcription, DNA-templated; regulation of receptor signaling pathway via JAK-STAT; tRNA wobble uridine modification
Sources:Amigo / QuickGO
Orthologs
Databases	NCBI: entry; OMA: entry
Species	Human	Mouse
Entrez	55250	58523
Ensembl	ENSG00000134759	ENSMUSG00000024271
UniProt	Q6IA86	Q91WG4
RefSeq (mRNA)	NM_001242875; NM_001242876; NM_001242877; NM_001242878; NM_001242879 NM_018255; NM_001324465; NM_001324466; NM_001324467; NM_001324468; NM_001324469	NM_021448; NM_001360909
RefSeq (protein)	NP_001229804; NP_001229805; NP_001229806; NP_001229807; NP_001229808 NP_001311394; NP_001311395; NP_001311396; NP_001311397; NP_060725	NP_067423; NP_001347838
Location (UCSC)	Chr 18: 36.13 – 36.18 Mb	Chr 18: 24.74 – 24.77 Mb
PubMed search
- Wikidata
View/Edit Human	View/Edit Mouse

Elongator complex protein 2 is a protein that in humans is encoded by the ELP2 gene.

== Interactions ==
ELP2 has been shown to interact with STAT3 and Janus kinase 1.
