= Janus kinase 1 =

Mammalian protein found in humans

JAK1
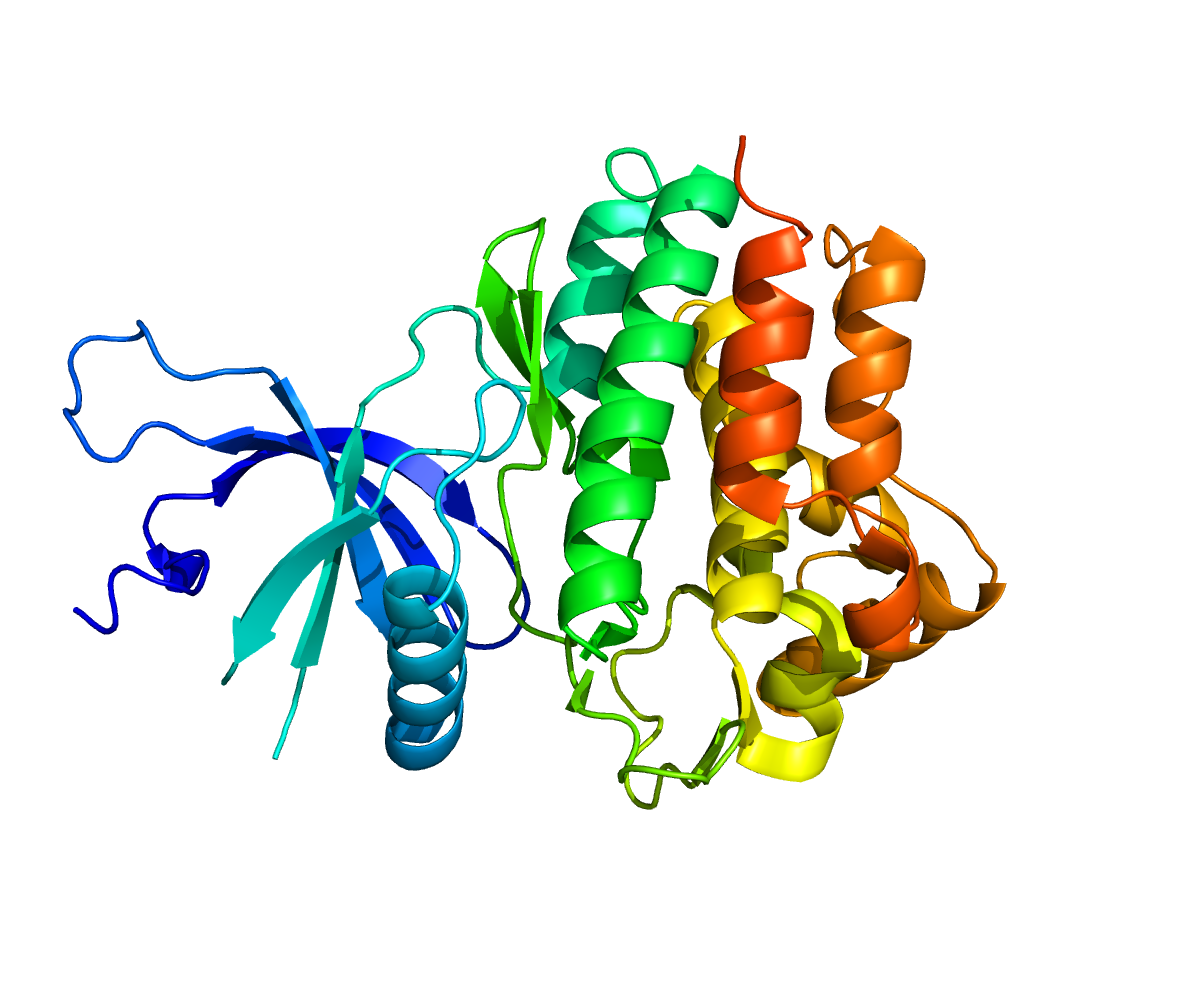

Identifiers
- Aliases: JAK1, JAK1A, JAK1B, JTK3, Janus kinase 1, AIIDE
- External IDs: OMIM: 147795; MGI: 96628; GeneCards: JAK1
Available structures
PDB	Ortholog search: PDBe RCSB
PDB	List of PDB id codes 3EYG, 3EYH, 4E4L, 4E4N, 4E5W, 4EHZ, 4EI4, 4FK6, 4I5C, 4IVB, 4IVC, 4IVD, 4K6Z, 4K77, 4L00, 4L01, 5E1E, 5HX8, 5IXD, 5IXI
Enzyme activity
EC #	BRENDA	ExPASy	KEGG	MetaCyc
2.7.10.2	↗	↗	↗	↗

Gene location (Human)
Chr.	Chromosome 1 (human)
Band	1p31.3	Start	64,833,229 bp
Band	1p31.3	End	65,067,754 bp

Gene location (Mouse)
Chr.	Chromosome 4 (mouse)
Band	4 C6|4 46.19 cM	Start	101,152,367 bp
Band	4 C6|4 46.19 cM	End	101,265,282 bp
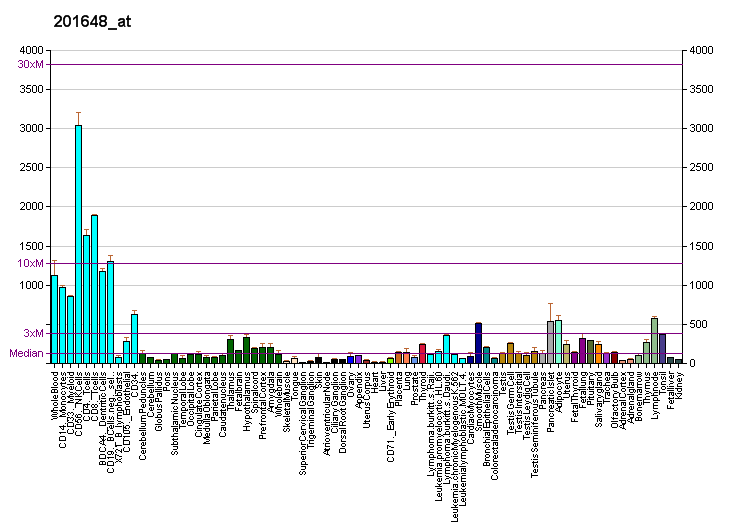
RNA expression pattern
Bgee	Human / Mouse (ortholog); Top expressed in: beta cell; skin of hip; Achilles tendon; epithelium of nasopharynx; lymph node; cartilage tissue; superficial temporal artery; skin of thigh; parietal pleura; glutes / Top expressed in: tibiofemoral joint; gastrula; lymph node; triceps brachii muscle; granulocyte; mesenteric lymph nodes; ankle; sternocleidomastoid muscle; blood; temporal muscle; More reference expression data
BioGPS	More reference expression data
Gene ontology
Molecular function	transferase activity; nucleotide binding; protein kinase activity; CCR5 chemokine receptor binding; growth hormone receptor binding; metal ion binding; kinase activity; protein binding; protein tyrosine kinase activity; protein phosphatase binding; signaling receptor binding; ATP binding; ubiquitin protein ligase binding; non-membrane spanning protein tyrosine kinase activity
Cellular component	cytoplasm; cytosol; membrane; focal adhesion; extrinsic component of cytoplasmic side of plasma membrane; cytoskeleton; endomembrane system; nucleus; endosome
Biological process	cell differentiation; intracellular signal transduction; phosphorylation; transmembrane receptor protein tyrosine kinase signaling pathway; interferon-gamma-mediated signaling pathway; response to antibiotic; MAPK cascade; positive regulation of sprouting angiogenesis; protein phosphorylation; regulation of type I interferon-mediated signaling pathway; regulation of interferon-gamma-mediated signaling pathway; regulation of cell population proliferation; type I interferon signaling pathway; interleukin-2-mediated signaling pathway; peptidyl-tyrosine autophosphorylation; protein autophosphorylation; cell migration; innate immune response; interleukin-12-mediated signaling pathway; interleukin-7-mediated signaling pathway; interleukin-15-mediated signaling pathway; interleukin-9-mediated signaling pathway; regulation of molecular function; peptidyl-tyrosine phosphorylation; cytokine-mediated signaling pathway; interleukin-21-mediated signaling pathway; interleukin-6-mediated signaling pathway; interleukin-27-mediated signaling pathway; interleukin-35-mediated signaling pathway
Sources:Amigo / QuickGO
Orthologs
Databases	NCBI: entry; OMA: entry
Species	Human	Mouse
Entrez	3716	16451
Ensembl	ENSG00000162434	ENSMUSG00000028530
UniProt	P23458	P52332
RefSeq (mRNA)	NM_002227; NM_001320923; NM_001321852; NM_001321853; NM_001321854 NM_001321855; NM_001321856; NM_001321857	NM_146145; NM_013567
RefSeq (protein)	NP_001307852; NP_001308781; NP_001308782; NP_001308783; NP_001308784 NP_001308785; NP_001308786; NP_002218	n/a
Location (UCSC)	Chr 1: 64.83 – 65.07 Mb	Chr 4: 101.15 – 101.27 Mb
PubMed search
- Wikidata
View/Edit Human	View/Edit Mouse

Janus kinase 1 (JAK1) is a human tyrosine kinase protein essential for signaling for certain type I and type II cytokines. It interacts with the common gamma chain (γc) of type I cytokine receptors, to elicit signals from the IL-2 receptor family (e.g. IL-2R, IL-7R, IL-9R and IL-15R), the IL-4 receptor family (e.g. IL-4R and IL-13R), the gp130 receptor family (e.g. IL-6R, IL-11R, LIF-R, OSM-R, cardiotrophin-1 receptor (CT-1R), ciliary neurotrophic factor receptor (CNTF-R), neurotrophin-1 receptor (NNT-1R) and Leptin-R). It is also important for transducing a signal by type I (IFN-α/β) and type II (IFN-γ) interferons, and members of the IL-10 family via type II cytokine receptors. Jak1 plays a critical role in initiating responses to multiple major cytokine receptor families. Loss of Jak1 is lethal in neonatal mice, possibly due to difficulties suckling. Expression of JAK1 in cancer cells enables individual cells to contract, potentially allowing them to escape their tumor and metastasize to other parts of the body.

== Interactions ==
Janus kinase 1 has been shown to interact with:

- ELP2,
- GNB2L1
- IL6ST,
- Grb2,
- IL2RB,
- IRS1,
- IL10RA,
- PTPN11,
- STAM2,
- STAT3,
- STAT5A,
- STAT5B, and
- TNFRSF1A.

== See also ==
- Janus kinase inhibitor
