= Interleukin 21 =

Mammalian protein found in humans

IL21

Identifiers
- Aliases: IL21, CVID11, IL-21, Za11, interleukin 21
- External IDs: OMIM: 605384; MGI: 1890474; GeneCards: IL21
Available structures
PDB	Ortholog search: PDBe RCSB
PDB	List of PDB id codes 2OQP, 3TGX

Gene location (Human)
Chr.	Chromosome 4 (human)
Band	4q27	Start	122,610,108 bp
Band	4q27	End	122,621,066 bp

Gene location (Mouse)
Chr.	Chromosome 3 (mouse)
Band	3|3 B	Start	37,276,908 bp
Band	3|3 B	End	37,286,785 bp
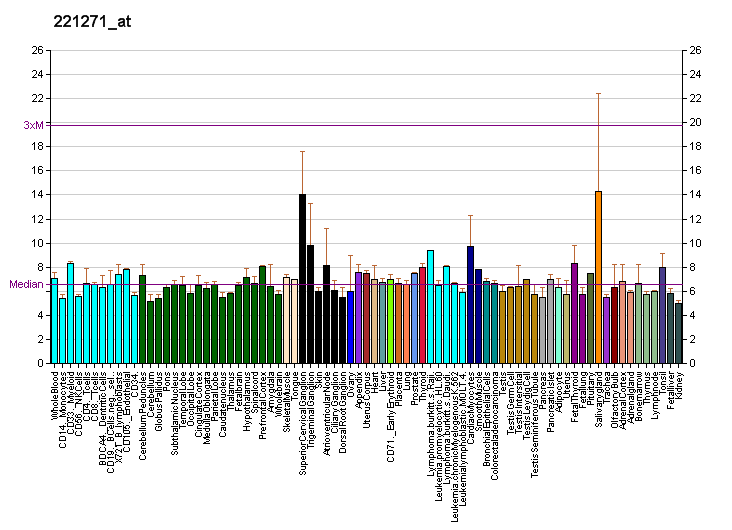
RNA expression pattern
Bgee	Human / Mouse (ortholog); Top expressed in: testicle; lymph node; appendix; buccal mucosa cell; tonsil; rectum; urinary bladder; left testis; right testis; gallbladder / Top expressed in: spermatocyte; spermatid; mesenteric lymph nodes; thymus; triceps brachii muscle; submandibular gland; anterior horn of spinal cord; central gray substance of midbrain; More reference expression data
BioGPS	More reference expression data
Gene ontology
Molecular function	cytokine activity; interleukin-2 receptor binding; cytokine receptor binding
Cellular component	intracellular anatomical structure; extracellular space; extracellular region
Biological process	positive regulation of inflammatory response; positive regulation of cytokine production; cell maturation; positive regulation of B cell proliferation; positive regulation of tissue remodeling; positive regulation of T cell proliferation; immune response; positive regulation of cell population proliferation; positive regulation of interleukin-17 production; positive regulation of natural killer cell mediated cytotoxicity; signal transduction; tyrosine phosphorylation of STAT protein; positive regulation of tyrosine phosphorylation of STAT protein; regulation of signaling receptor activity; interleukin-21-mediated signaling pathway
Sources:Amigo / QuickGO
Orthologs
Databases	NCBI: entry; OMA: entry
Species	Human	Mouse
Entrez	59067	60505
Ensembl	ENSG00000138684	ENSMUSG00000027718
UniProt	Q9HBE4	Q9ES17
RefSeq (mRNA)	NM_021803; NM_001207006	NM_021782; NM_001291041
RefSeq (protein)	NP_001193935; NP_068575	NP_001277970; NP_068554
Location (UCSC)	Chr 4: 122.61 – 122.62 Mb	Chr 3: 37.28 – 37.29 Mb
PubMed search
- Wikidata
View/Edit Human	View/Edit Mouse

Interleukin 21 (IL-21) is a protein that in humans is encoded by the IL21 gene.

Interleukin-21 is a cytokine that has potent regulatory effects on cells of the immune system, including natural killer (NK) cells and cytotoxic T cells that can destroy virally infected or cancerous cells. This cytokine induces cell division/proliferation in its target cells.

== Gene ==
The human IL-21 gene is about 8.43kb, mapped to chromosome 4 and 180kb from IL-2 gene, and the mRNA product is 616 nucleotides long.

== Tissue and cell distribution ==
IL-21 is expressed in activated human CD4^{+} T cells but not in most other tissues. In addition, IL-21 expression is up-regulated in T_{h}2 and T_{h}17 subsets of T helper cells, as well as T follicular cells. In fact, it was shown that IL-21 can be used to identify peripheral T follicular helper cells. Furthermore, IL-21 is expressed in NK T cells regulating the function of these cells.

Interleukin-21 is also produced by Hodgkin's lymphoma (HL) cancer cells (which is surprising because IL-21 was thought to be produced only in T cells). This observation may explain a great deal of the behavior of classical Hodgkin's lymphoma including clusters of other immune cells gathered around HL cells in cultures. Targeting IL-21 may be a potential treatment or possibly a test for HL.

== Receptor ==
The IL-21 receptor (IL-21R) is expressed on the surface of T, B and NK cells. IL-21r is similar in structure to the receptors for other type I cytokines like IL-2R or IL-15 and requires dimerization with the common gamma chain (γc) in order to bind IL-21. When bound to IL-21, the IL-21 receptor acts through the Jak/STAT pathway, utilizing Jak1 and Jak3 and a STAT3 homodimer to activate its target genes.

== Clinical relevance ==
=== Role in allergies ===
It has been shown that IL-21R knock-out mice express higher levels of IgE and lower levels of IgG1 than normal mice after antigen exposure. IgE levels decreased after mice were injected with IL-21. This has implications for the role of IL-21 in controlling allergic responses because of the role of IgE in hypersensitivity type 1 responses. IL-21 has been tried as therapy for alleviating allergic responses. It was shown to be successful in decreasing pro-inflammatory cytokines produced by T cells in addition to decreasing IgE levels in a mouse model for rhinitis (nasal passage inflammation). A study using mice with peanut allergies showed that systemic treatment of IL-21 was an effective means of mitigating the allergic response. This has strong implications for the pharmacological development of IL-21 for controlling both localized and systemic allergies.

=== Role in cancer immunotherapy ===
A role for IL-21 in modulating the differentiation programming of human T cells was first reported by Li et al., where it was shown to enrich for a population of central memory-type CTL with a unique CD28+ CD127hi CD45RO+ phenotype with IL-2 producing capacity. Tumor-reactive antigen-specific CTL generated by priming in the presence of IL-21 led to a stable, 'helper-independent' phenotype. IL-21 is also noted to have anti-tumour effects through continued and increased CD8+ cell response to achieve enduring tumor immunity.

IL-21 was approved for Phase 1 clinical trials in metastatic melanoma (MM) and renal cell carcinoma (RCC) patients. It was shown to be safe for administration with flu-like symptoms as side effects. Dose-limiting toxicities included low lymphocyte, neutrophil, and thrombocyte count as well as hepatotoxicity. According to the Response Evaluation Criteria in Solid Tumors (RECIST) response scale, 2 out of 47 MM patients and 4 out of 19 RCC patients showed complete and partial responses, respectively. In addition, there was an increase of perforin, granzyme B, IFN-γ, and CXCR3 mRNA in peripheral NK cells and CD8^{+} T cells. This suggested that IL-21 enhances the CD8^{+} effector functions thus leading to anti-tumor response. IL-21 proceeded to Phase 2 clinical trials where it was administered alone or coupled with drugs as sorafinib and rituximab.

=== Role in viral infections ===
IL-21 may be a critical factor in the control of persistent viral infections. IL-21 (or IL-21R) knock-out mice infected with chronic LCMV (lymphocytic choriomeningitis virus) were not able to overcome chronic infection compared to normal mice. Besides, these mice with impaired IL-21 signaling had more dramatic exhaustion of LCMV-specific CD8+ T cells, suggesting that IL-21 produced by CD4+ T cells is required for sustained CD8+ T cell effector activity and then, for maintaining immunity to resolve persistent viral infection. Thus, IL-21 may contribute to the mechanism by which CD4+ T helper cells orchestrate the immune system response to viral infections.

In HIV infected subjects, IL-21 has been reported to critically improve the HIV-specific cytotoxic T cell responses and NK cell functions. It has also been shown that HIV-specific CD4 T cells from “HIV controllers” (rare individuals who don’t progress to AIDS by controlling the virus replication without treatment) are able to produce significantly more IL-21 than those of progressors. In addition, IL-21 producing virus specific CD8 T cells were also preferentially found in HIV controllers. These data and the fact that IL-21 stimulated CD8 or NK cells are able to inhibit HIV viral replication in vitro, show that this cytokine could potentially be useful for anti-HIV therapeutics.

== Drug development ==
An antibody to IL-21 is in development for multiple inflammatory conditions (Clinicaltrials.gov entries).
