= Interleukin-9 receptor =

Protein-coding gene in the species Homo sapiens

IL9R

Identifiers
- Aliases: IL9R, CD129, IL-9R, interleukin 9 receptor
- External IDs: OMIM: 300007; MGI: 96564; GeneCards: IL9R

Gene location (Human)
Chr.	X chromosome (human)
Band	Xq28 and Yq12	Start	155,997,696 bp
Band	Xq28 and Yq12	End	156,010,817 bp

Gene location (Mouse)
Chr.	Chromosome 11 (mouse)
Band	11|11 A4	Start	32,137,541 bp
Band	11|11 A4	End	32,150,279 bp
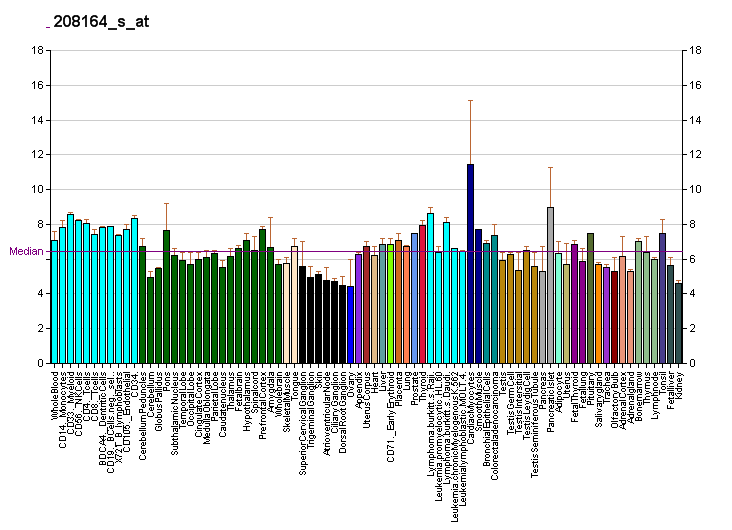

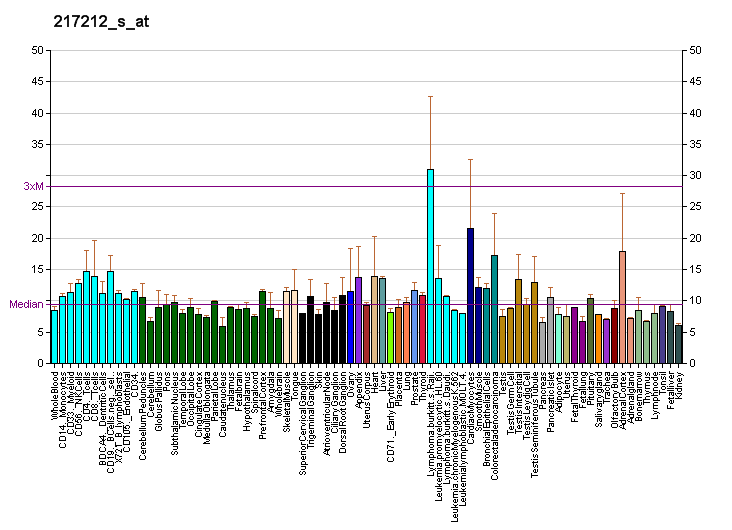

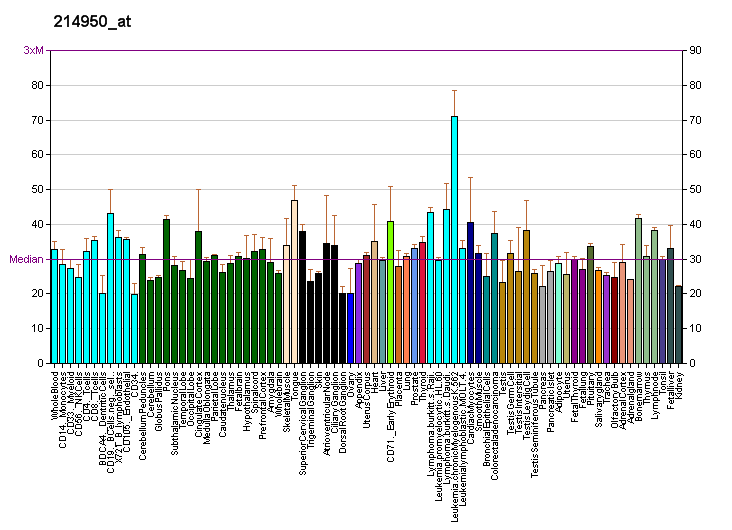
RNA expression pattern
Bgee	Human / Mouse (ortholog); Top expressed in: gonad; lymph node; granulocyte; appendix; spleen; right uterine tube; rectum; urinary bladder; blood; mucosa of transverse colon / Top expressed in: spermatocyte; embryo; thymus; neural layer of retina; spermatid; spleen; lip; adrenal gland; muscle; nucleus of stria terminalis; More reference expression data
BioGPS	More reference expression data
Gene ontology
Molecular function	cytokine receptor activity; interleukin-9 receptor activity; protein binding
Cellular component	integral component of membrane; integral component of plasma membrane; membrane; extracellular region; extracellular space; plasma membrane
Biological process	cell population proliferation; signal transduction; interleukin-9-mediated signaling pathway; regulation of cell population proliferation
Sources:Amigo / QuickGO
Orthologs
Databases	NCBI: entry; OMA: entry
Species	Human	Mouse
Entrez	3581	16199
Ensembl	ENSG00000124334	ENSMUSG00000020279
UniProt	Q01113	Q01114
RefSeq (mRNA)	NM_002186; NM_176786	NM_001134458; NM_008374
RefSeq (protein)	NP_002177; NP_789743	NP_001127930; NP_032400
Location (UCSC)	Chr X: 156 – 156.01 Mb	Chr 11: 32.14 – 32.15 Mb
PubMed search
- Wikidata
View/Edit Human	View/Edit Mouse

Interleukin 9 receptor (IL9R) also known as CD129 (Cluster of Differentiation 129) is a type I cytokine receptor. IL9R also denotes its human gene.

The protein encoded by this gene is a cytokine receptor that specifically mediates the biological effects of interleukin 9 (IL9). The functional IL9 receptor complex requires this protein as well as the interleukin 2 receptor, gamma (IL2RG), a common gamma subunit shared by the receptors of many different cytokines. The ligand binding of this receptor leads to the activation of various JAK kinases and STAT proteins, which connect to different biologic responses. This gene is located at the pseudoautosomal regions of X and Y chromosomes. Genetic studies suggested an association of this gene with the development of asthma. Multiple pseudogenes on chromosome 9, 10, 16, and 18 have been described. Alternatively spliced transcript variants encoding distinct isoforms have been reported.

== Interactions ==
Interleukin-9 receptor has been shown to interact with YWHAZ.

== See also ==
- Cluster of differentiation
