= IL2RB =

Protein-coding gene in the species Homo sapiens

Identifiers
- Aliases: IL2RB, CD122, IL15RB, P70-75, interleukin 2 receptor subunit beta, IMD63
- External IDs: OMIM: 146710; MGI: 96550; GeneCards: IL2RB
Available structures
PDB	Ortholog search: PDBe RCSB
PDB	List of PDB id codes 2B5I, 2ERJ, 3QAZ, 4GS7

Gene location (Human)
Chr.	Chromosome 22 (human)
Band	22q12.3	Start	37,125,843 bp
Band	22q12.3	End	37,175,054 bp

Gene location (Mouse)
Chr.	Chromosome 15 (mouse)
Band	15 E1|15 37.52 cM	Start	78,363,456 bp
Band	15 E1|15 37.52 cM	End	78,379,471 bp
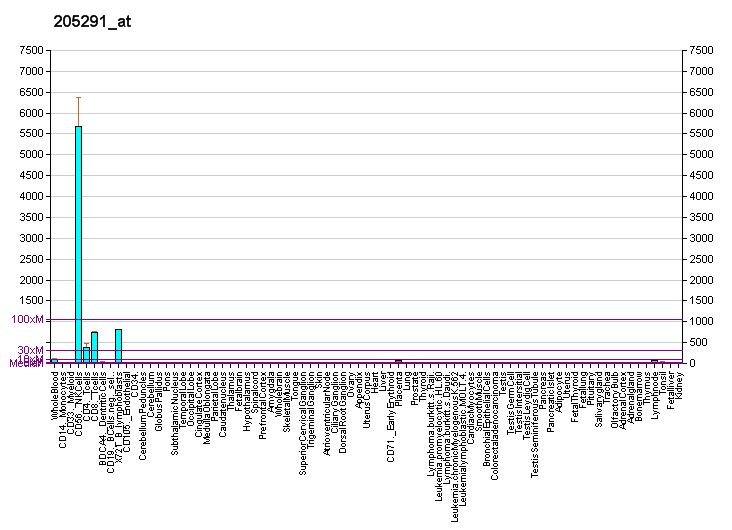
RNA expression pattern
Bgee	Human / Mouse (ortholog); Top expressed in: granulocyte; decidua; mucosa of ileum; blood; lymph node; spleen; appendix; bone marrow cell; mucosa of urinary bladder; epithelium of nasopharynx / Top expressed in: mesenteric lymph nodes; blood; decidua; spleen; secondary oocyte; gastrula; zygote; thymus; pharynx; lumbar subsegment of spinal cord; More reference expression data
BioGPS	More reference expression data
Gene ontology
Molecular function	interleukin-2 binding; protein binding; cytokine receptor activity; interleukin-2 receptor activity; interleukin-15 receptor activity
Cellular component	integral component of membrane; membrane; plasma membrane; integral component of plasma membrane; external side of plasma membrane; endosome; cytosol; interleukin-2 receptor complex; cell surface
Biological process	negative regulation of apoptotic process; MAPK cascade; interleukin-2-mediated signaling pathway; viral process; signal transduction; cytokine-mediated signaling pathway; interleukin-15-mediated signaling pathway; regulation of molecular function; positive regulation of phagocytosis; protein-containing complex assembly
Sources:Amigo / QuickGO
Orthologs
Databases	NCBI: entry; OMA: entry
Species	Human	Mouse
Entrez	3560	16185
Ensembl	ENSG00000100385	ENSMUSG00000068227
UniProt	P14784	P16297
RefSeq (mRNA)	NM_000878; NM_001346222; NM_001346223	NM_008368
RefSeq (protein)	NP_000869; NP_001333151; NP_001333152	NP_032394
Location (UCSC)	Chr 22: 37.13 – 37.18 Mb	Chr 15: 78.36 – 78.38 Mb
PubMed search
- Wikidata
View/Edit Human	View/Edit Mouse

Interleukin-2 receptor subunit beta is a protein that in humans is encoded by the IL2RB gene. Also known as CD122; IL15RB; P70-75.

== Function ==
The interleukin 2 receptor, which is involved in T cell-mediated immune responses, is present in 3 forms with respect to ability to bind interleukin 2. The low affinity form is a monomer of the alpha subunit (also called CD25) and is not involved in signal transduction. The intermediate affinity form consists of a gamma/beta subunit heterodimer, while the high affinity form consists of an alpha/beta/gamma subunit heterotrimer. Both the intermediate and high affinity forms of the receptor are involved in receptor-mediated endocytosis and transduction of mitogenic signals from interleukin 2. The protein encoded by this gene represents the beta subunit and is a type I membrane protein.

This protein also forms one of the three subunits of the IL-15 receptor.

Activation of the receptor increases proliferation of CD8+ effector T cells.

== Interactions ==
IL2RB has been shown to interact with:

- CISH,
- HGS,
- Janus kinase 1, and
- SHC1.

== Clinical significance ==
IL2RB-mediated interleukin-15 (IL-15) signaling has been implicated in the pathogenesis of celiac disease. Increased IL-15 signaling promotes activation of intraepithelial lymphocytes, epithelial injury, and persistent intestinal inflammation, including in some patients who remain symptomatic despite adherence to a gluten-free diet.

== See also ==
- IL-2 receptor
- IL-15 receptor
