= IL-2 receptor =

Lymphocyte receptor specific for Interleukin-2

interleukin 2 receptor, alpha chain
- Structure of interleukin-2 with its alpha, beta, and gammac receptors. PDB rendering based on 2B5I.

Identifiers
- Symbol: IL2RA
- Alt. symbols: IL2R CD25
- NCBI gene: 3559
- HGNC: 6008
- OMIM: 147730
- RefSeq: NM_000417
- UniProt: P01589

Other data
- Locus: Chr. 10 p15.1
Search for
- Structures: Swiss-model
- Domains: InterPro

interleukin 2 receptor, beta chain
- Structure of IL2 with one chain of IL2RA, two chains of IL2RB, two chains of IL2RG. PDB rendering based on 2b5i.

Identifiers
- Symbol: IL2RB
- Alt. symbols: CD122
- NCBI gene: 3560
- HGNC: 6009
- OMIM: 146710
- RefSeq: NM_000878
- UniProt: P14784

Other data
- Locus: Chr. 22 q13
Search for
- Structures: Swiss-model
- Domains: InterPro

interleukin 2 receptor, gamma chain (severe combined immunodeficiency)
- Crystallographic structure of IL-2 (center alpha helices) complexed with the common gamma chain (IL2RG; 10 O'Clock to 1 O'Clock), IL2RA (4 O'Clock), and IL2RB (7 O'Clock to 9 O'Clock). Each protein is individually rainbow colored (N-terminus = blue, C-terminus = red).

Identifiers
- Symbol: IL2RG
- Alt. symbols: SCIDX1, IMD4, CD132
- NCBI gene: 3561
- HGNC: 6010
- OMIM: 308380
- RefSeq: NM_000206
- UniProt: P31785

Other data
- Locus: Chr. X q13
Search for
- Structures: Swiss-model
- Domains: InterPro

The interleukin-2 receptor (IL-2R) is a heterotrimeric protein expressed on the surface of certain immune cells, such as lymphocytes, that binds and responds to a cytokine called IL-2.

== Composition ==
IL-2 binds to the IL-2 receptor, which has three forms, generated by different combinations of three different proteins, often referred to as "chains": α (alpha) (also called IL-2Rα, CD25, or Tac antigen), β (beta) (also called IL-2Rβ, or CD122), and γ (gamma) (also called IL-2Rγ, γ_{c}, common gamma chain, or CD132); these subunits are also parts of receptors for other cytokines. The β and γ chains of the IL-2R are members of the type I cytokine receptor family.

== Structure-activity relationships of the IL-2/IL-2R interaction ==
The three receptor chains are expressed separately and differently on various cell types and can assemble in different combinations and orders to generate low, intermediate, and high affinity IL-2 receptors.

The α chain binds IL-2 with low affinity, the combination of β and γ together form a complex that binds IL-2 with intermediate affinity, primarily on memory T cells and NK cells; and all three receptor chains form a complex that binds IL-2 with high affinity (Kd ~ 10^{−11} M) on activated T cells and regulatory T cells. The intermediate and high affinity receptor forms are functional and cause changes in the cell when IL-2 binds to them.

The structure of the stable complex formed when IL-2 binds to the high affinity receptor has been determined using X-ray crystallography. The structure supports a model wherein IL-2 initially binds to the α chain, then the β is recruited, and finally γ.

== Signaling ==
The three IL-2 receptor chains span the cell membrane and extend into the cell, thereby delivering biochemical signals to the cell interior. The alpha chain does not participate in signaling, but the beta chain is complexed with an enzyme called Janus kinase 1 (JAK1), that is capable of adding phosphate groups to molecules. Similarly the gamma chain complexes with another tyrosine kinase called JAK3. These enzymes are activated by IL-2 binding to the external domains of the IL-2R. As a consequence, three intracellular signaling pathways are initiated, the MAP kinase pathway, the Phosphoinositide 3-kinase (PI3K) pathway, and the JAK-STAT pathway.

Once IL-2 binds to the high affinity receptor, the complex is rapidly internalized and has only a short time to signal. IL-2, IL-2Rβ, and γ_{c} are rapidly degraded, but IL-2Rα is recycled to the cell surface. Thus, the concentration of IL-2 and its receptor available determines the tempo, magnitude and extent of T cell immune responses.

IL-2 and its receptor have key roles in key functions of the immune system, tolerance and immunity, primarily via their direct effects on T cells. In the thymus, where T cells mature, they prevent autoimmune diseases by promoting the differentiation of certain immature T cells into regulatory T cells, which kill off other T cells that are primed to attack normal healthy cells in the body. IL-2/IL2R also promotes the differentiation of T cells into effector T cells and into memory T cells when the initial T cells is also stimulated by an antigen, thus helping the body fight off infections. Through their role in the development of T cell immunologic memory, which depends upon the expansion of the number and function of antigen-selected T cell clones, they also have a key role in enduring cell-mediated immunity.

== Clinical implications ==
Drugs that inhibit IL-2 receptors, such as basiliximab and daclizumab are used in conjunction with other drugs to prevent immune rejection of transplants.

== History ==
According to an immunology textbook: "IL-2 is particularly important historically, as it is the first type I cytokine that was cloned, the first type I cytokine for which a receptor component was cloned, and was the first short-chain type I cytokine whose receptor structure was solved. Many general principles have been derived from studies of this cytokine, including its being the first cytokine demonstrated to act in a growth factor–like fashion through specific high-affinity receptors, analogous to the growth factors being studied by endocrinologists and biochemists".

== See also ==
CD25 deficiency
