= Interleukin 9 =

Protein-coding gene in the species Homo sapiens

IL9

Identifiers
- Aliases: IL9, HP40, IL-9, P40, interleukin 9
- External IDs: OMIM: 146931; MGI: 96563; GeneCards: IL9

Gene location (Human)
Chr.	Chromosome 5 (human)
Band	5q31.1	Start	135,892,246 bp
Band	5q31.1	End	135,895,841 bp

Gene location (Mouse)
Chr.	Chromosome 13 (mouse)
Band	13 B1|13 30.06 cM	Start	56,627,090 bp
Band	13 B1|13 30.06 cM	End	56,630,059 bp
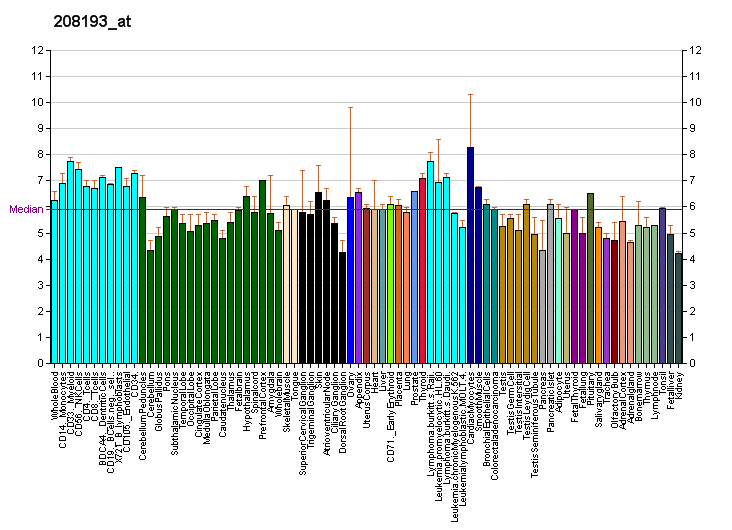
RNA expression pattern
Bgee	Human / Mouse (ortholog); Top expressed in: tibial nerve; sural nerve; amygdala; caudate nucleus; Brodmann area 9; right frontal lobe; substantia nigra; primary visual cortex; putamen; cingulate gyrus / Top expressed in: embryo; entorhinal cortex; CA3 field; choroid plexus of fourth ventricle; zygote; inferior colliculi; spermatocyte; uterus; gonad; male reproductive system; More reference expression data
BioGPS	More reference expression data
Gene ontology
Molecular function	interleukin-9 receptor binding; cytokine activity; growth factor activity; cytokine receptor binding
Cellular component	extracellular region; extracellular space
Biological process	positive regulation of cell growth; inflammatory response; immune response; positive regulation of cell population proliferation; regulation of signaling receptor activity; interleukin-9-mediated signaling pathway
Sources:Amigo / QuickGO
Orthologs
Databases	NCBI: entry; OMA: entry
Species	Human	Mouse
Entrez	3578	16198
Ensembl	ENSG00000145839	ENSMUSG00000021538
UniProt	P15248	P15247
RefSeq (mRNA)	NM_000590	NM_008373
RefSeq (protein)	NP_000581	NP_032399
Location (UCSC)	Chr 5: 135.89 – 135.9 Mb	Chr 13: 56.63 – 56.63 Mb
PubMed search
- Wikidata
View/Edit Human	View/Edit Mouse

Interleukin 9, also known as IL-9, is a pleiotropic cytokine (cell signalling molecule) belonging to the group of interleukins. IL-9 is produced by variety of cells like mast cells, NKT cells, Th2, Th17, Treg, ILC2, and Th9 cells in different amounts. Among them, Th9 cells are regarded as the major CD4+ T cells that produce IL-9.

== Functions ==
Il-9 is a cytokine secreted by CD4+ helper cells that acts as a regulator of a variety of hematopoietic cells. This cytokine stimulates cell proliferation and prevents apoptosis. It functions through the interleukin-9 receptor (IL9R), which activates different signal transducer and activator (STAT) proteins namely STAT1, STAT3 and STAT5 and thus connects this cytokine to various biological processes. The gene encoding this cytokine has been identified as a candidate gene for asthma. Genetic studies on a mouse model of asthma demonstrated that this cytokine is a determining factor in the pathogenesis of bronchial hyperresponsiveness.

Interleukin-9 has also been shown to inhibit melanoma growth in mice.

Additionally, it gives rise to the multiplication of hematologic neoplasias and also Hodgkin's lymphoma in humans but IL-9 also has antitumor properties in solid tumors, for example melanoma.

== Discovery ==
IL-9 was first described in the late 1980s as a member of a growing number of cytokines that had pleiotropic functions in the immune system. IL-9 remains an understudied cytokine despite the attribution of many biological functions to it. IL-9 was first purified and characterized as a T cell and mast cell growth factor and termed as P40, based on its molecular weight, or MEA, based on its mast cell growth-enhancing activity. The cloning and complete amino acid sequencing of P40 disclosed that it is structurally different from other T cell growth factors. It was therefore named IL-9 based on its biological effects on both myeloid and lymphoid cells.

The identification and cloning was first done by Yang and colleagues as a mitogenic factor for a human megakaryoblastic leukemia. The same human cDNA was isolated again by cross-hybridization with the mouse IL-9 probe.

== Gene location ==
The human IL-9 gene is located on the long arm of human chromosome 5 at band 5q31-32, a region which is not found in a number of patients with acquired chromosome 5q deletion syndrome.

== Protein structure ==
Human IL-9 protein sequence contains 144 residues with a typical signal peptide of 18 amino acids. There is also the presence of 9 cysteines in mature polypeptide and 4 N-linked glycosylation sites. Until recently, IL-9 was thought to be evolutionary related to IL-7. However, we know now that IL-9 is closer to IL-2 and IL-15 than to IL-7, at both the tertiary and amino acid sequence levels.

== Production ==
Interleukin 33 (IL-33) induces IL-9 expression and secretion in T cells, which was confirmed by the results obtained in mice by using Human in vitro system. Whereas the report of others confirms that TGF-β is an essential factor for IL-9 induction. For the first time (Lars Blom, Britta C. Poulsen, Bettina M. Jensen, Anker Hansen and Lars K. Poulsen published a journal online in 2011 Jul 6), indicating that TGF-β may be important for production of IL-9 but it is not only the definite requirement for IL-9 induction, since cultures with IL-33 without TGF-β have noticeably increased secretion of IL-9, suggesting an important role of IL-33, even though that the effect was not found significant on the gene level.

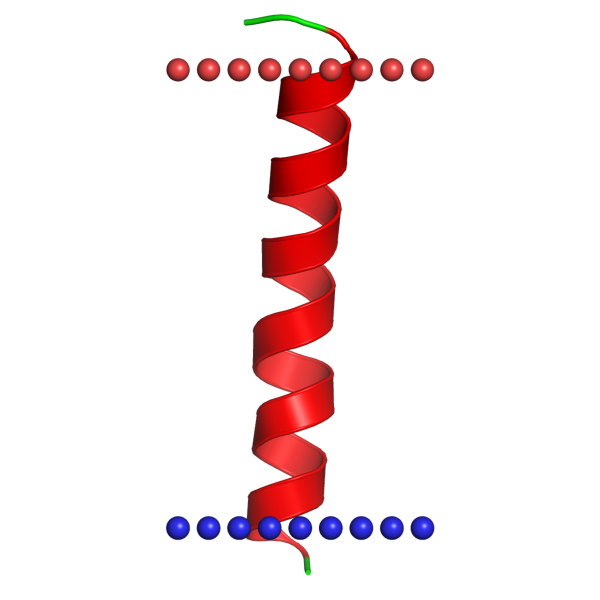
Interleukin-9 receptor

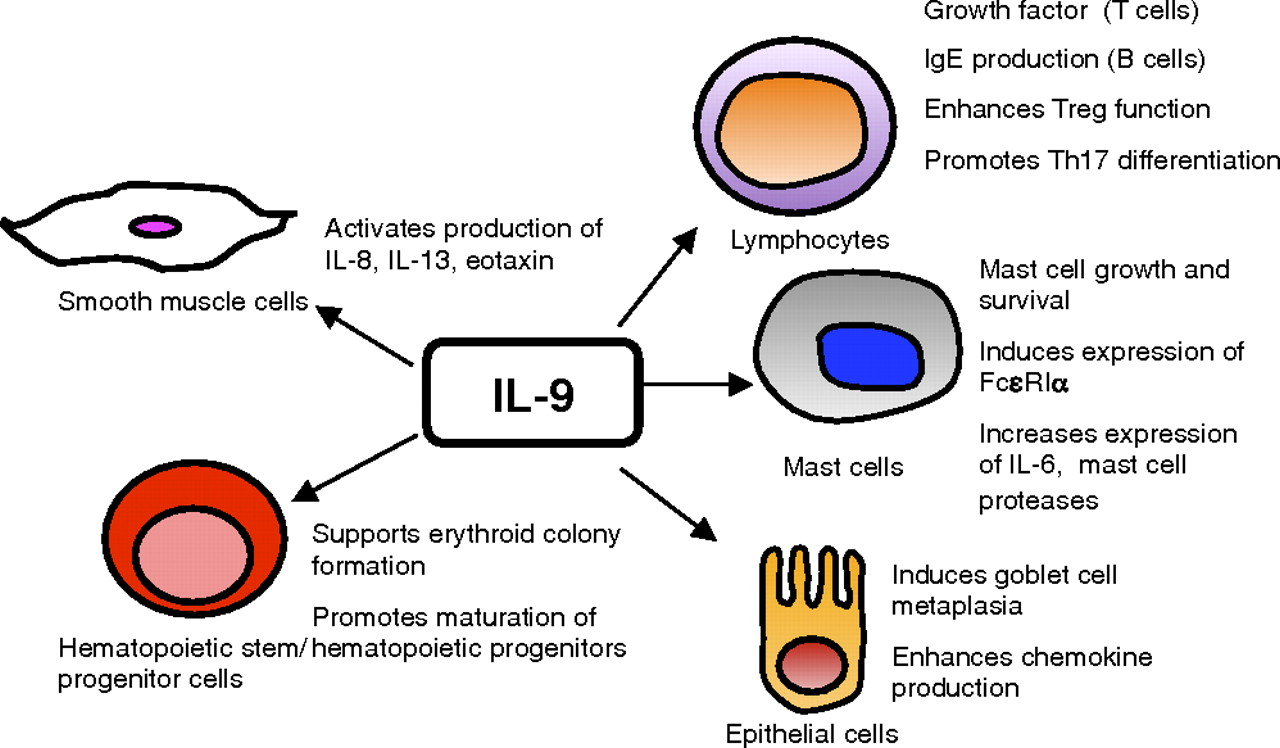
IL-9 has different direct and indirect effects on multiple cell types that affect the development of immunity and inflammation.

== IL-9 expression ==
The analysis of IL-9 expression in different types of tumours such as Large cell anaplastic lymphoma (LCAL) and Hodgkin's Disease (HD) by Northern blot analysis and in situ hybridization has shown that IL-9 is not involved as an autocrine growth factor in the pathogenesis of most B and T-cell lymphomas, but it may have a part in HD and LCAL autocrine growth.

The further investigation could be done to conclude another probability, that, the in vivo overexpression of IL-9 might show the unique symptoms related to eosinophilia which was recently reported for Interleukin 5 positive cases of HD.

IL-9 was found to be the first physiological stimulus triggering BCL3 expression in T cells and mast cells by the analysis done in mouse.
