= Thymic stromal lymphopoietin =

Cytokine, alarmin, and growth factor

TSLP
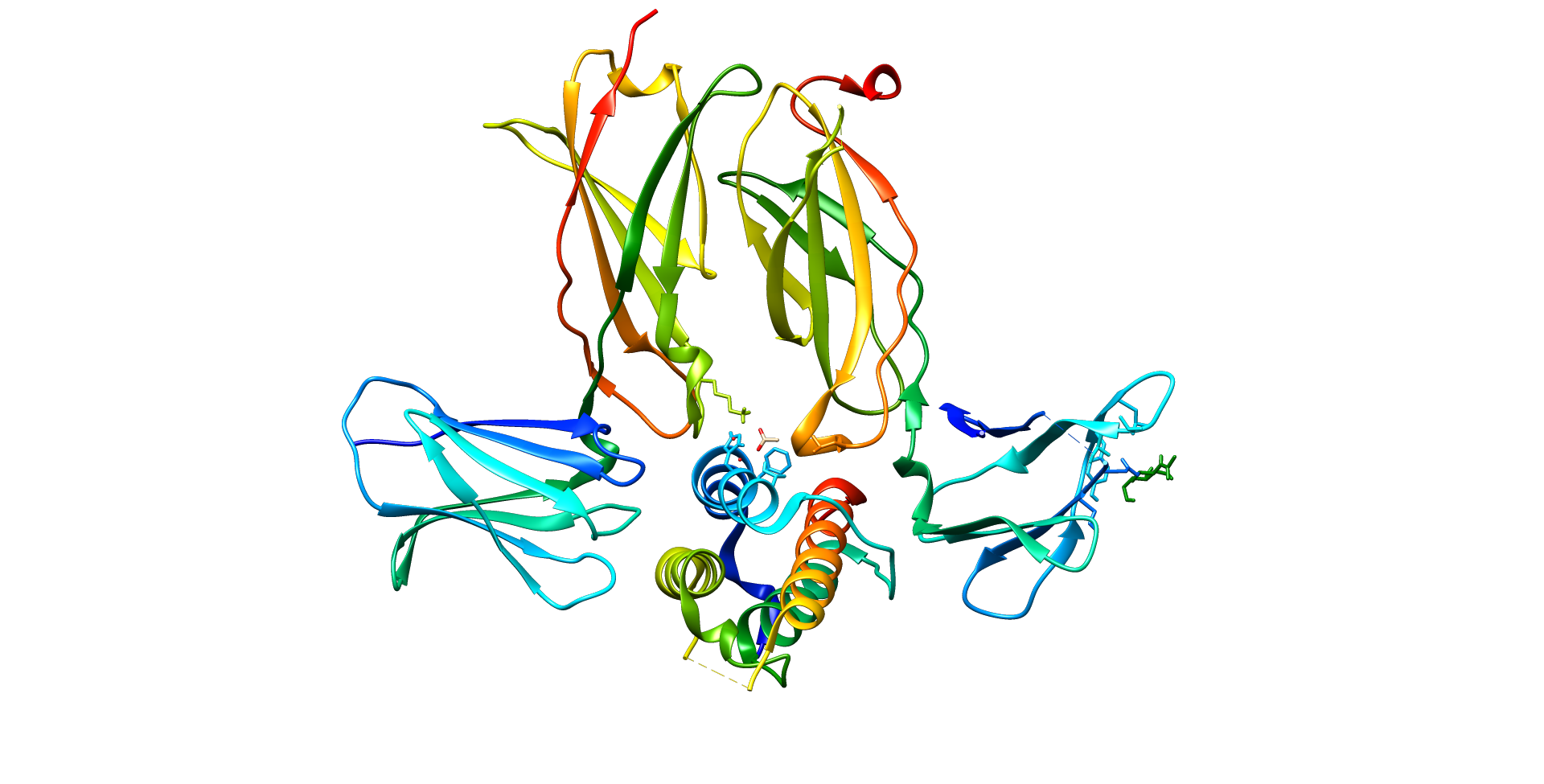

Identifiers
- Aliases: TSLP, thymic stromal lymphopoietin
- External IDs: OMIM: 607003; MGI: 1855696; GeneCards: TSLP
Available structures
PDB	Ortholog search: PDBe RCSB
PDB	List of PDB id codes 4NN5, 4NN6, 4NN7

Gene location (Human)
Chr.	Chromosome 5 (human)
Band	5q22.1	Start	111,070,062 bp
Band	5q22.1	End	111,078,026 bp

Gene location (Mouse)
Chr.	Chromosome 18 (mouse)
Band	18 B1|18 18.12 cM	Start	32,948,436 bp
Band	18 B1|18 18.12 cM	End	32,952,850 bp
RNA expression pattern
Bgee	Human / Mouse (ortholog); Top expressed in: pancreatic epithelial cell; gallbladder; cartilage tissue; right lobe of liver; right ventricle; myocardium of left ventricle; apex of heart; urinary bladder; prostate; right coronary artery / Top expressed in: embryo; embryo; left lung lobe; endothelial cell of lymphatic vessel; zygote; Paneth cell; right lung; right lung lobe; secondary oocyte; atrioventricular valve; More reference expression data
BioGPS	n/a
Gene ontology
Molecular function	cytokine activity; interleukin-7 receptor binding
Cellular component	extracellular space; extracellular region
Biological process	regulation of signaling receptor activity; interleukin-7-mediated signaling pathway; positive regulation of cytokine-mediated signaling pathway; positive regulation of cell population proliferation; positive regulation of chemokine production; positive regulation of interleukin-10 production; positive regulation of interleukin-13 production; positive regulation of interleukin-5 production; positive regulation of interleukin-6 production; positive regulation of mast cell activation; positive regulation of tyrosine phosphorylation of STAT protein; negative regulation of apoptotic process; positive regulation of inflammatory response; defense response to Gram-negative bacterium; defense response to fungus; antimicrobial humoral immune response mediated by antimicrobial peptide; positive regulation of chemokine (C-C motif) ligand 1 production; positive regulation of granulocyte colony-stimulating factor production; positive regulation of receptor signaling pathway via STAT
Sources:Amigo / QuickGO
Orthologs
Databases	NCBI: entry; OMA: entry
Species	Human	Mouse
Entrez	85480	53603
Ensembl	ENSG00000145777	ENSMUSG00000024379
UniProt	Q969D9	Q9JIE6
RefSeq (mRNA)	NM_033035; NM_138551	NM_021367
RefSeq (protein)	NP_149024; NP_612561	NP_067342
Location (UCSC)	Chr 5: 111.07 – 111.08 Mb	Chr 18: 32.95 – 32.95 Mb
PubMed search
- Wikidata
View/Edit Human	View/Edit Mouse

Thymic stromal lymphopoietin (TSLP) is an interleukin (IL)-7-like cytokine, alarmin, and growth factor involved in numerous physiological and pathological processes, primarily those of the immune system. It shares a common ancestor with IL-7.

Originally appreciated for its role in immune cell proliferation and development, and then for its pivotal role in type 2 immune responses, TSLP is now known to be involved in other types of immune responses, autoimmune disease, and certain cancers.

== Discovery ==
As the name suggests, TSLP was initially discovered as a growth factor derived from the supernatant of a mouse thymic stromal cell line that was found to promote the survival and proliferation of B lymphocytes. In contrast, human TSLP was found to preferentially stimulate myeloid cells.

== Gene ==
TSLP production has been observed in numerous species, including humans and mice.

In humans, TSLP is encoded by the TSLP gene. Alternative splicing of TSLP results in two transcript variants, a long form (lfTSLP, or just TSLP) consisting of 159 amino acid residues, and a short form (sfTSLP) consisting of 63 amino acid residues. These variants use different initiation methionine codons and share a carboxy terminus.

sfTSLP mRNA is constitutively expressed in normal human bronchial epithelial cells (NHBE), normal human lung fibroblasts (NHLF), and bronchial smooth muscle cells (BSMC). sfTSLP mRNA expression is not significantly upregulated by inflammation.

TSLP mRNA is not constitutively expressed in NHBE and has a low level of constitutive expression in NHLF and BSMC. TSLP mRNA expression is upregulated by certain Toll-like receptor (TLR) ligands such as flagellin and poly(I:C), but not by lipopolysaccharide (LPS) or macrophage-activating lipopeptide 2 (MALP-2).

== Function ==
TSLP was initially observed to have both pro-inflammatory and anti-inflammatory activity. It is now clear that this seemingly ambivalent action can actually be divided between the two transcript variants, with TSLP being pro-inflammatory and sfTSLP being anti-inflammatory.

=== Short form ===
sfTSLP inhalation prevents airway epithelial barrier disruption caused by the inhalation of house dust mite (HDM) antigens in mice who had been sensitised to HDM, an asthma-like model. Similarly, sfTSLP reduces the severity of dextran sulphate sodium (DSS)-induced colitis in mice, a model of inflammatory bowel disease (IBD), and prevents endotoxic shock and sepsis resulting from bacterial infections.

A receptor for sfTSLP has not been discovered. It is not known whether sfTSLP also signals via the TSLP receptor complex.

=== Long form ===
==== Epithelium defense ====
TSLP's pivotal role in initiating immune responses begins with its release by epithelial or stromal cells of the lungs, skin, or gastrointestinal tract as an alarmin following mechanical cell injury, pattern recognition receptor (PRR) and protease-activated receptor (PAR) activation, stimulation by certain cytokines, chemical irritation, or infection.

When local mast cells bind an allergen, they produce TSLP indirectly by releasing tryptase in an FcεRI-dependent manner, activating PARs on epithelial cells and causing them to release TSLP. Unlike IL-33, a similarly acting alarmin, TSLP is usually not constitutively expressed and must be upregulated by transcription factors such as nuclear factor κ-light-chain-enhancer of activated B cells (NF-κB) or activator protein (AP)1 following insult.

Local dendritic cells (DCs) are among the most important targets of TSLP, as they, among other antigen presenting cells (APCs), allow the immune system to mount adaptive responses. TSLP signalling grants DCs the exact phenotype needed to prime naive CD_{4}^{+} T cells into T_{H}2 pro-inflammatory cells, or producing type 2 cytokines, namely by upregulating OX40L, CD80, and CD86. TSLP-stimulated DCs that migrate into draining lymph nodes can prime CD_{4}^{+} T cells into follicular helper T (T_{FH}) cells, which in turn can promote immunoglobulin (Ig)G and E production by resident B lymphocytes, thus initiating type 2 immune responses. T_{H}2 can also facilitate B cell class switching towards IgE.

As mentioned, TSLP serves as an alarmin following TLR binding by certain pathogen-associated molecular patterns (PAMPs), including viral and bacterial ones, rather than just irritation by allergens. Thus, TSLP also plays an early role in the initiation of type 1 and 3 immune responses to pathogens. This activity has thus far been best described in the respiratory mucosa.

TSLP-activated CD_{11}b^{+} DCs can promote the proliferation and long-term survival of CD_{8}^{+} cytotoxic T cells, promoting the development of lasting adaptive cellular immunity. Analogously, TSLP-activated CD_{11}c^{+} cells are essential for the development of IgA antibodies following pneumococcal infection. TSLP also holds considerable promise as a novel vaccine adjuvant and anti-cancer immunotherapy due to its broad and potent alarmin functionality, as is evidenced by numerous animal studies.

==== Germinal centre formation ====
Germinal centres (GCs) are microstructures that form in secondary lymphoid organs during immune responses. GCs are the sites of the clonal expansion of B lymphocytes and the affinity maturation of their antibodies, thus allowing the immune system to generate antibodies with a high affinity for antigens. TSLP may play an important role in the formation of GCs, as the depletion of TSPLR in CD_{4}^{+} T cells prevented their formation in mice, as well as the generation of IgG1.

==== Signalling ====
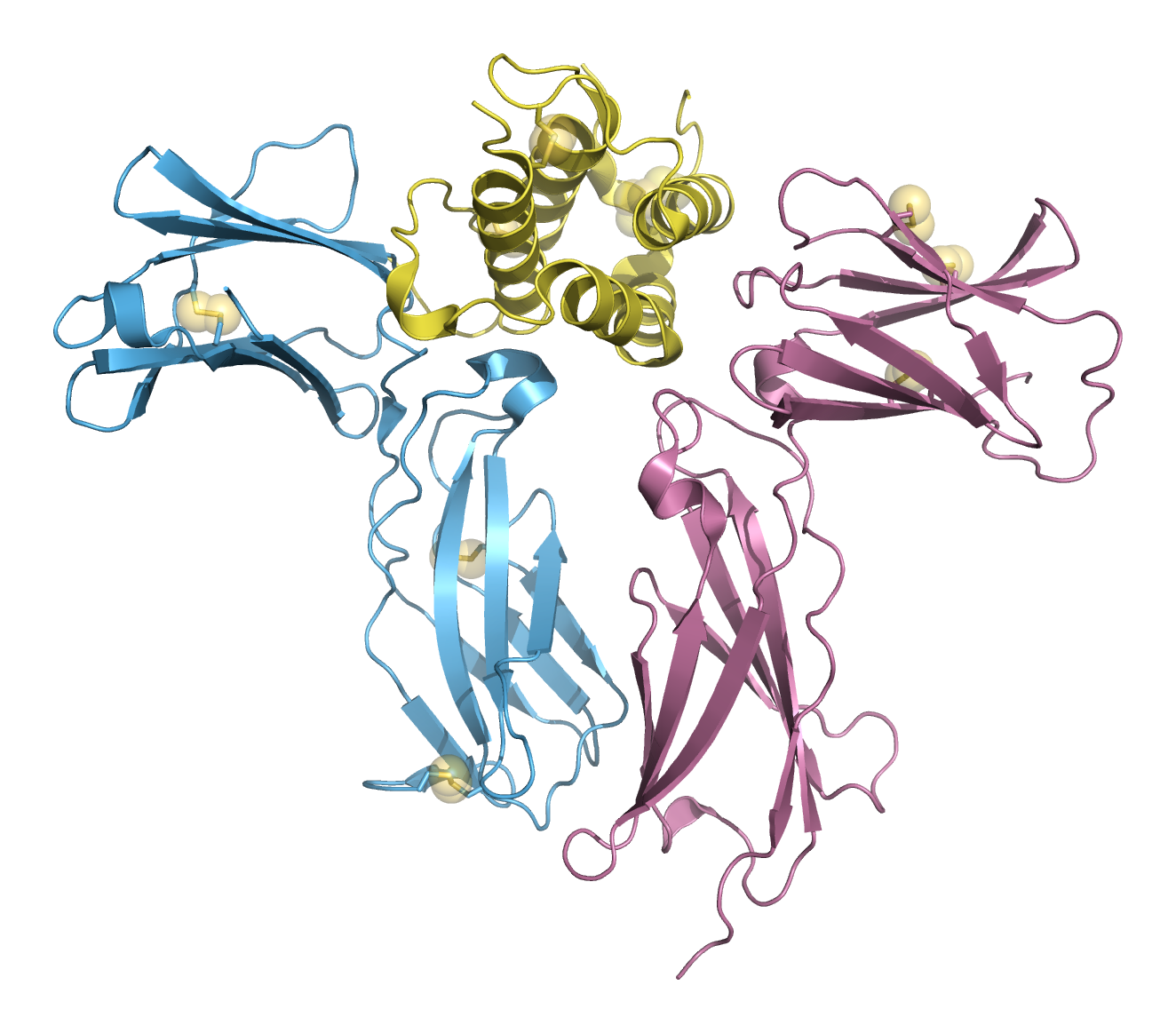
Crystal structure of human TSLP in complex with TSLP-R and IL-7Ra (pdb 5j11)

TSLP signals through a heterodimeric receptor complex composed of the TSLP receptor (TSLPR) and the IL-7Rα chain. Upon binding, Janus kinase (JAK)1 and 2 are activated, leading to the activation of signal transducer and activator of transcription (STAT)5A and 5B and, to a lesser extent, STAT1 and 3. These transcription factors upregulate pro-inflammatory cytokines such as IL-4, 5, 9, and 13.

== Clinical significance ==
TSLP expression is linked to many disease states including asthma, inflammatory arthritis, atopic dermatitis, eczema, eosinophilic esophagitis and other allergic states. The factors inducing the activation of TSLP release are not clearly defined.

=== Asthma ===
Expression of TSLP is enhanced under asthma-like conditions (aka Airway HyperResponsiveness or AHR model in the mouse), conditioning APCs in order to orient the differentiation of T cells coming into the lungs towards a TH2 profile (T helper 2 pathway). The TH2 cells then release factors promoting an inflammatory reaction following the repeated contact with a specific antigen in the airways.

=== Atopic dermatitis ===
TSLP-activated Langerhans cells of the epidermis induce the production of pro-inflammatory cytokines like TNF-alpha by T cells potentially causing atopic dermatitis. It is thought that by understanding the mechanism of TSLP production and those potential substances that block the production, one may be able to prevent or treat conditions of asthma and/or eczema.

=== Therapeutic targeting ===
The TSLP signaling axis is an attractive therapeutic target. Amgen's Tezepelumab, a monoclonal antibody which blocks TSLP, is currently approved for the treatment of severe asthma. Fusion proteins consisting of TSLPR and IL-7Rα which can trap TSLP with excellent affinity have also been designed. Additional approaches towards TSLP/TSLPR inhibition include peptides derived from the TSLP:TSLPR interface, natural products and computational fragment-based screening.
