= Janus kinase 3 inhibitor =

Janus kinase 3 inhibitors, also called JAK3 inhibitors, are a new class of immunomodulatory agents that inhibit Janus kinase 3. They are used for the treatment of autoimmune diseases. The Janus kinases are a family of four nonreceptor tyrosine-protein kinases, JAK1, JAK2, JAK3, and TYK2. They signal via the JAK/STAT pathway, which is important in regulating the immune system. Expression of JAK3 is largely restricted to lymphocytes (predominant expression is in the hematopoietic system), while the others are ubiquitously expressed, so selective targeting of JAK3 over the other JAK isozymes is attractive as a possible treatment of autoimmune diseases.

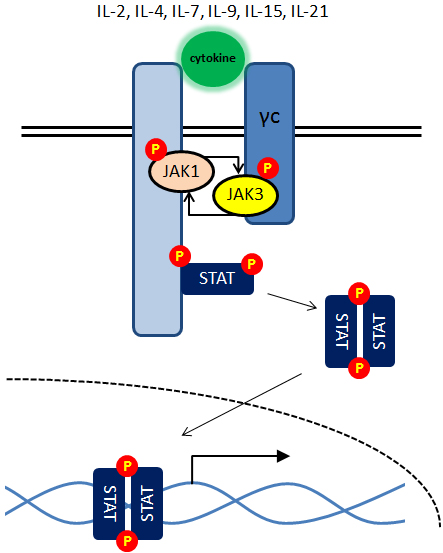
Activation of JAK3 by cytokine receptors that contain the common gamma chain (γc)

== Mechanism of action ==
Janus kinase 3 inhibitors work by inhibiting the action of the enzyme Janus kinase 3, thereby interfering with the JAK-STAT signaling pathway. JAK3 is required for signaling by cytokines through the common γ chain of the interleukin receptors for IL-2, IL-4, IL-7, IL-9, IL-15, and IL-21. However, JAK1 is also required as the two kinases cooperate for signaling. This signaling process leads to phosphorylation and dimerization of the adaptor proteins STAT. When activated, they translocate into the nucleus, where they modulate gene transcription. By selectively inhibiting JAK3, downward signaling can be blocked.

JAK3 is crucial in transmitting signals from cytokines that are responsible for either T-cell proliferation, differentiation, or development. It is also of high importance in the development of B-cells and NK-cells. Inhibition of JAK3, then, could prove to be a powerful immunosuppressant. Since JAK3 is restricted to the immune system, while the other JAKs such as JAK1 are much more broadly expressed, selective targeting of JAK3 could decrease possible adverse effects and improve tolerability.

As an immunosuppressant, JAK3 inhibitors could aid in autoimmune diseases such as rheumatoid arthritis, psoriasis, or other diseases where the immune system fails to distinguish self from nonself and starts attacking self cells.

== Discovery and development ==
=== Discovery ===
One of the first JAKs targeted in drug development for medical use was JAK3. Immune system depression is observed in patients with JAK3 defects. The role of JAK3 is greatly restricted to the immune system, so this enzyme was thought to be a good target for selective immunosuppressant. Whether JAK3 alone is sufficient to suppress cytokine signaling is uncertain, as it can also be caused by stimulation of JAK1. Whether inhibiting JAK3 is as efficient as pan-JAK inhibition is under study. Many compounds with high affinity and possible selectivity for JAK3 have been discovered with high-throughput screening.

=== Development ===
Currently, much attention is focused on developing Janus kinase inhibitors as drugs for immune diseases including inflammatory bowel diseases, rheumatoid arthritis, alopecia areata, and psoriases.

The first JAK inhibitor approved for the treatment of rheumatoid arthritis was tofacitinib. It has also shown promising results in other autoimmune disorders. Initially, tofacitinib was thought to be a selective JAK3 inhibitor, but later was found to be a potent inhibitor of JAK1 and JAK2. The value of developing a selective JAK3 targeting over the other JAKs is that JAK3 expression is restricted to the immune system, while the other JAKs are much more broadly expressed. Since JAK3 is not as ubiquitously expressed, selective targeting could improve tolerability, and decrease possible adverse effects and safety concerns. For example, dual inhibition of JAK1 and JAK3 might increase bacterial and viral infection because of a broader immunosuppressive effect. Inhibition of JAK2 has been linked to adverse effects such as anaemia and generalised leukopenia.

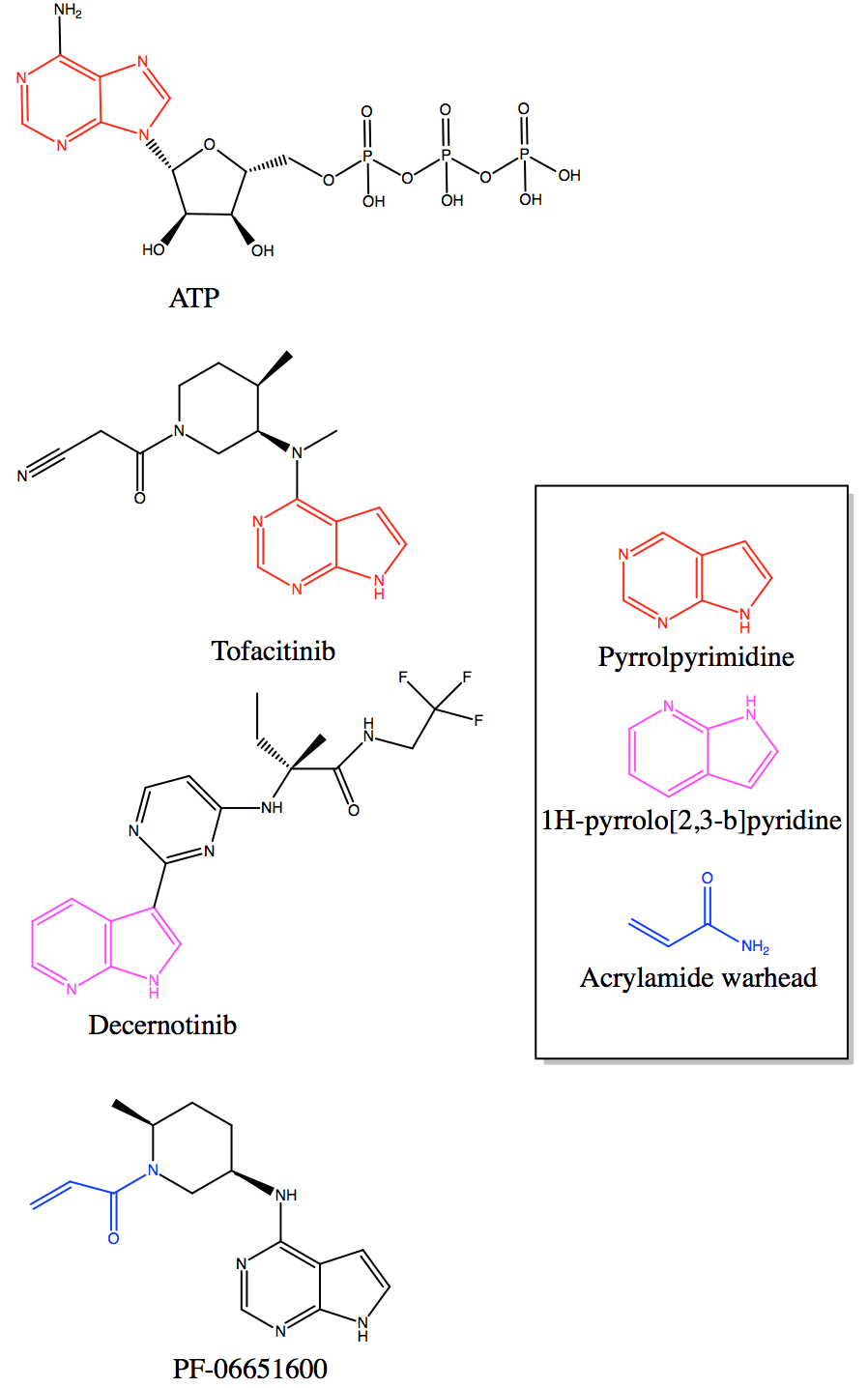
Common structure groups of ATP and inhibitors that target the ATP binding site on JAK3.

Developing sufficiently selective JAK3 inhibitors has been difficult. One of the reason is the small variation in the ATP binding site of different JAKs. Another problem is that JAK3 has a higher affinity for ATP than the other JAKs, which can be a reason for a poor translation from in vitro enzymatic assay studies to cellular system studies. An example of this is decernotinib, which showed 41-fold selectivity for JAK3 vs JAK1 in in vitro enzyme assays, while the selectivity for JAK3 was not maintained in cellular assays, where it showed a slight preference for JAK1.

=== Structure activity relationship ===
JAK3 inhibitors target the catalytic ATP-binding site of JAK3 and various moieties have been used to get a stronger affinity and selectivity to the ATP-binding pockets. The base that is often seen in compounds with selectivity for JAK3 is pyrrolopyrimidine, as it binds to the same region of the JAKs as purine of the ATP binds. Another ring system that has been used in JAK3 inhibitor derivatives is 1H-pyrrolo[2,3-b]pyridine, as it mimics the pyrrolopyrimidine scaffold.

Sequence alignment has shown that the ATP binding pockets of the JAKs are almost identical and only a few features distinguish JAK3 from the rest. One of these differences is the presence of cysteine residue (Cys909) in the front region of the ATP binding pocket, where the other JAKs have serine at that same position. Only 10 other kinases possess a cysteine at that location, making cysteine even more intriguing as a target for a better selectivity. The focus has been on structures that can react with cysteine and have the electrophilic warhead acrylamide have been of interest, as they should ideally react only with proximal cysteine. Covalent cysteine targeting can be tricky, as off-target reaction can lead to adverse reactions, but as the JAKs resynthesize rapidly, covalent inhibition could be necessary to extend the pharmacodynamics.

To compare inhibitors, the parameter of choice is IC50; by measuring IC50 for different JAKs, determining selectivity is possible. In the kinase family, JAK3 has the highest affinity for ATP, so measuring IC50 in high concentrations of ATP show whether the inhibitor can compete with ATP for the binding site.

== Medical use ==
Several therapeutic options exist for the treatment of autoimmune diseases, but the search is still going on for safer, more effective, and more convenient treatments. Inhibition of JAK3 has in research shown to be a good target for immunosuppression.

The only indication for a JAK3 inhibitor at the moment, rheumatoid arthritis, is for the nonselective JAK1/JAK3 inhibitor tofacitinib. Other indications, such as psoriasis, alopecia areata, and ulcerative colitis are in clinical trials. Cytokines have an important role in autoimmune diseases and as the common γ chain cytokines interleukin IL-2, IL-4, IL-7, IL-9, IL-15, and IL-21 signal via JAK3, the inhibition of JAK3 and blocking of the signaling of these cytokines could affect many immune diseases and lead to development of new effective immunosuppressive drugs.

== List of JAK3 inhibitors ==
=== Nonselective JAK3 inhibitor ===
- Tofacitinib (CP-690, 550)
  - An inhibitor of JAK1/JAK3, it was in 2012 granted approval from the FDA to treat rheumatoid arthritis.

=== JAK3 inhibitors in clinical trials ===
- Decernotinib (VX-509)
  - A JAK3 inhibitor, it has shown efficacy in a phase IIa study in rheumatoid arthritis.
- Ritlecitinib
  - An irreversible covalent JAK3 selective inhibitor, it is in phase II in pipelines at Pfizer for alopecia areata, rheumatoid arthritis, and ulcerative colitis.
