= Lipogenesis =

Biochemical process involving the production of fats

In biochemistry, lipogenesis is the conversion of fatty acids and glycerol into fats, or a metabolic process through which acetyl-CoA is converted to triglyceride for storage in fat. Lipogenesis encompasses both fatty acid and triglyceride synthesis, with the latter being the process by which fatty acids are esterified to glycerol before being packaged into very-low-density lipoprotein (VLDL). Fatty acids are produced in the cytoplasm of cells by repeatedly adding two-carbon units to acetyl-CoA. Triacylglycerol synthesis, on the other hand, occurs in the endoplasmic reticulum membrane of cells by bonding three fatty acid molecules to a glycerol molecule. Both processes take place mainly in liver and adipose tissue. Nevertheless, it also occurs to some extent in other tissues such as the gut and kidney. After being packaged into VLDL in the liver, the resulting lipoprotein is then secreted directly into the blood for delivery to peripheral tissues.

== Fatty acid synthesis ==
Fatty acid synthesis starts with acetyl-CoA and builds up by the addition of two-carbon units. Fatty acid synthesis occurs in the cytoplasm of cells while oxidative degradation occurs in the mitochondria. Many of the enzymes for the fatty acid synthesis are organized into a multienzyme complex called fatty acid synthase. The major sites of fatty acid synthesis are adipose tissue and the liver.

== Triglyceride synthesis ==
Triglycerides are synthesized by esterification of fatty acids to glycerol. Fatty acid esterification takes place in the endoplasmic reticulum of cells by metabolic pathways in which acyl groups in fatty acyl-CoAs are transferred to the hydroxyl groups of glycerol-3-phosphate and diacylglycerol. Three fatty acid chains are bonded to each glycerol molecule. Each of the three -OH groups of the glycerol reacts with the carboxyl end of a fatty acid chain (-COOH). Water is eliminated and the remaining carbon atoms are linked by an -O- bond through dehydration synthesis.

Both the adipose tissue and the liver can synthesize triglycerides. Those produced by the liver are secreted from it in the form of very-low-density lipoproteins (VLDL). VLDL particles are secreted directly into blood, where they function to deliver the endogenously derived lipids to peripheral tissues.

Enzymatically, the glycerol-3-phosphate pathway occurs in the endoplasmic reticulum where it is acylated by glycerol-3-phosphate acyltransferase (GPAT), 1-acylglycerol-3-phosphate acyltransferase (AGPAT), subsequently dephosphorylated by lipin, and finally converted by diacylglycerol acyltransferase (DGAT).

== Hormonal regulation ==
Insulin is a peptide hormone that is critical for managing the body's metabolism. Insulin is released by the pancreas when blood sugar levels rise, and it has many effects that broadly promote the absorption and storage of sugars, including lipogenesis.

Insulin stimulates lipogenesis primarily by activating two enzymatic pathways. Pyruvate dehydrogenase (PDH), converts pyruvate into acetyl-CoA. Acetyl-CoA carboxylase (ACC), converts acetyl-CoA produced by PDH into malonyl-CoA. Malonyl-CoA provides the two-carbon building blocks that are used to create larger fatty acids.

Insulin stimulation of lipogenesis also occurs through the promotion of glucose uptake by adipose tissue. The increase in the uptake of glucose can occur through the use of glucose transporters directed to the plasma membrane or through the activation of lipogenic and glycolytic enzymes via covalent modification. The hormone has also been found to have long term effects on lipogenic gene expression. It is hypothesized that this effect occurs through the transcription factor SREBP-1, where the association of insulin and SREBP-1 lead to the gene expression of glucokinase. The interaction of glucose and lipogenic gene expression is assumed to be managed by the increasing concentration of an unknown glucose metabolite through the activity of glucokinase.

Another hormone that may affect lipogenesis through the SREBP-1 pathway is leptin. It is involved in the process by limiting fat storage through inhibition of glucose intake and interfering with other adipose metabolic pathways. The inhibition of lipogenesis occurs through the down regulation of fatty acid and triglyceride gene expression. Through the promotion of fatty acid oxidation and lipogenesis inhibition, leptin was found to control the release of stored glucose from adipose tissues.

Other hormones that prevent the stimulation of lipogenesis in adipose cells are growth hormones (GH). Growth hormones result in loss of fat but stimulate muscle gain. One proposed mechanism for how the hormone works is that growth hormones affects insulin signaling thereby decreasing insulin sensitivity and in turn down regulating fatty acid synthase expression. Another proposed mechanism suggests that growth hormones may phosphorylate with STAT5A and STAT5B, transcription factors that are a part of the Signal Transducer And Activator Of Transcription (STAT) family.

There is also evidence suggesting that acylation stimulating protein (ASP) promotes the aggregation of triglycerides in adipose cells. This aggregation of triglycerides occurs through the increase in the synthesis of triglyceride production.

=== PDH dephosphorylation ===
Insulin stimulates the activity of pyruvate dehydrogenase phosphatase. The phosphatase removes the phosphate from pyruvate dehydrogenase activating it and allowing for conversion of pyruvate to acetyl-CoA. This mechanism leads to the increased rate of catalysis of this enzyme, so increases the levels of acetyl-CoA. Increased levels of acetyl-CoA will increase the flux through not only the fat synthesis pathway but also the citric acid cycle.

=== Acetyl-CoA carboxylase ===
Insulin affects ACC in a similar way to PDH. It leads to its dephosphorylation via activation of PP2A phosphatase whose activity results in the activation of the enzyme. Glucagon has an antagonistic effect and increases phosphorylation, deactivation, thereby inhibiting ACC and slowing fat synthesis.

Affecting ACC affects the rate of acetyl-CoA conversion to malonyl-CoA. Increased malonyl-CoA level pushes the equilibrium over to increase production of fatty acids through biosynthesis. Long chain fatty acids are negative allosteric regulators of ACC and so when the cell has sufficient long chain fatty acids, they will eventually inhibit ACC activity and stop fatty acid synthesis.

AMP and ATP concentrations of the cell act as a measure of the ATP needs of a cell. When ATP is depleted, there is a rise in 5'AMP. This rise activates AMP-activated protein kinase, which phosphorylates ACC and thereby inhibits fat synthesis. This is a useful way to ensure that glucose is not diverted down a storage pathway in times when energy levels are low.

ACC is also activated by citrate. When there is abundant acetyl-CoA in the cell cytoplasm for fat synthesis, it proceeds at an appropriate rate.

== Transcriptional regulation ==
SREBPs have been found to play a role with the nutritional or hormonal effects on the lipogenic gene expression.

Overexpression of SREBP-1a or SREBP-1c in mouse liver cells results in the build-up of hepatic triglycerides and higher expression levels of lipogenic genes.

Lipogenic gene expression in the liver via glucose and insulin is moderated by SREBP-1. The effect of glucose and insulin on the transcriptional factor can occur through various pathways; there is evidence suggesting that insulin promotes SREBP-1 mRNA expression in adipocytes and hepatocytes. It has also been suggested that the hormone increases transcriptional activation by SREBP-1 through MAP-kinase-dependent phosphorylation regardless of changes in the mRNA levels. Along with insulin glucose also have been shown to promote SREBP-1 activity and mRNA expression.
