= Tezepelumab =

Monoclonal antibody

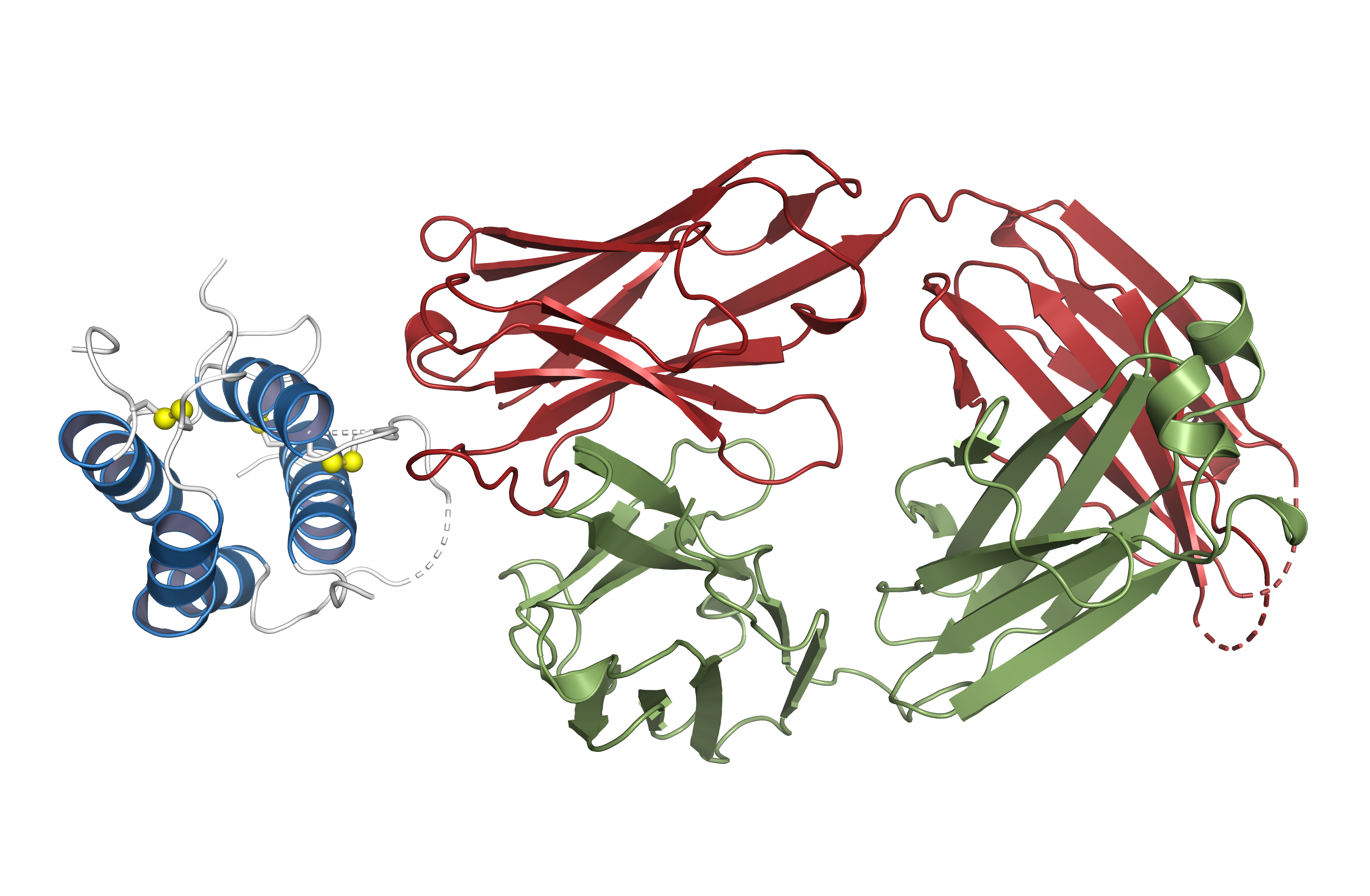
- Structural basis for inhibition of TSLP-signaling by Tezepelumab (PDB 5J13)

Monoclonal antibody
- Type: Whole antibody
- Source: Human
- Target: thymic stromal lymphopoietin (TSLP)

Clinical data
- Trade names: Tezspire
- Other names: MEDI9929, AMG 157, tezepelumab-ekko
- AHFS/Drugs.com: Monograph
- MedlinePlus: a622010
- License data: US DailyMed: Tezepelumab
- Routes of administration: Subcutaneous
- ATC code: R03DX11 (WHO)

Legal status
- Legal status: AU: S4 (Prescription only); CA: ℞-only / Schedule D; US: ℞-only; EU: Rx-only

Identifiers
- CAS Number: 1572943-04-4
- DrugBank: DB15090
- ChemSpider: None
- UNII: RJ1IW3B4QX
- KEGG: D11771

Chemical and physical data
- Formula: C_{6400}H_{9844}N_{1732}O_{1992}S_{52}
- Molar mass: 144590.40 g·mol^{−1}

Tezepelumab, sold under the brand name Tezspire, is a human monoclonal antibody used for the treatment of asthma, developed and sold by Amgen and AstraZeneca. Tezepelumab blocks thymic stromal lymphopoietin (TSLP), an epithelial cytokine that has been suggested to be critical in the initiation and persistence of airway inflammation.

Tezepelumab was approved for medical use in the United States in December 2021, and in the European Union in September 2022. The US Food and Drug Administration (FDA) considered it 2021 to be a first-in-class medication.

== Medical uses ==
Tezepelumab is indicated for the add-on maintenance treatment of people aged twelve years and older with severe asthma. In October 2025, it was approved for inadequately controlled chronic rhinosinusitis with nasal polyps (CRSwNP) for patients aged twelve years and older.

== Side effects ==
The most common side effects include arthralgia (joint pain) and pharyngitis (sore throat).

== Pharmacodynamics ==
Tezepelumab blocks thymic stromal lymphopoietin (TSLP), an epithelial cytokine that has been suggested to be critical in the initiation and persistence of airway inflammation. Structural studies by X-ray crystallography showed that tezepelumab competes against a critical part of the TSLPR binding site on TSLP.

== History ==
In 2020, tezepelumab demonstrated efficacy compared to placebo for patients with severe, uncontrolled asthma in phase III trials. Two main studies including over 1,500 adults and adolescents with inadequately controlled asthma showed that tezepelumab was effective in reducing the number of severe asthma flare‑ups, as evaluated in two clinical trials of participants with severe asthma. All participants were taking their usual treatment for asthma and participants received new treatment with either tezepelumab or placebo. Neither the participants nor the investigators knew which treatment was given. The benefit of tezepelumab was assessed by measuring the frequency of asthma attacks (exacerbations) at the end of both 52 week trials in comparison to placebo.

It was also studied for the treatment of chronic obstructive pulmonary disease, chronic rhinosinusitis with nasal polyps, chronic spontaneous urticaria and eosinophilic esophagitis (EoE).

== Society and culture ==
=== Legal status ===
In December 2021, the US Food and Drug Administration (FDA) approved tezepelumab based on evidence from two clinical trials (NAVIGATOR and PATHWAY) of 1334 participants with severe asthma. The safety and efficacy of tezepelumab were evaluated in two clinical trials of participants with severe asthma. The trials were conducted in 24 countries (Argentina, Australia, Austria, Bulgaria, Brazil, Canada, Czech Republic, France, Germany, Hungary, Israel, Japan, Lithuania, Latvia, Russia, Saudi Arabia, Serbia, Slovakia, South Africa, South Korea, Taiwan, Ukraine, United States, and Vietnam). The FDA considered it 2021 to be a first-in-class medication.

On 21 July 2022, the Committee for Medicinal Products for Human Use (CHMP) of the European Medicines Agency (EMA) adopted a positive opinion, recommending the granting of a marketing authorization for the medicinal product Tezspire, intended as add-on treatment in adults and adolescents with severe asthma. The applicant for this medicinal product is AstraZeneca AB. Tezepelumab was approved for medical use in the European Union in September 2022.

== See also ==
- dupilumab, anti IL-4 antibody to treat chronic rhinosinusitis with nasal polyps
- mepolizumab, anti–IL-5 to treat chronic rhinosinusitis with nasal polyps
- omalizumab anti–immunoglobulin E to treat chronic rhinosinusitis with nasal polyps
- stapokibart, anti IL-4 antibody to treat chronic rhinosinusitis with nasal polyps
