= Interleukin-7 receptor =

Protein found on the surface of cells

Interleukin-7 receptor-α

Identifiers
- Symbol: IL7R
- Alt. symbols: CD127
- NCBI gene: 3575
- HGNC: 6024
- OMIM: 146661
- RefSeq: NM_002185
- UniProt: P16871

Other data
- Locus: Chr. 5 p13
Search for
- Structures: Swiss-model
- Domains: InterPro

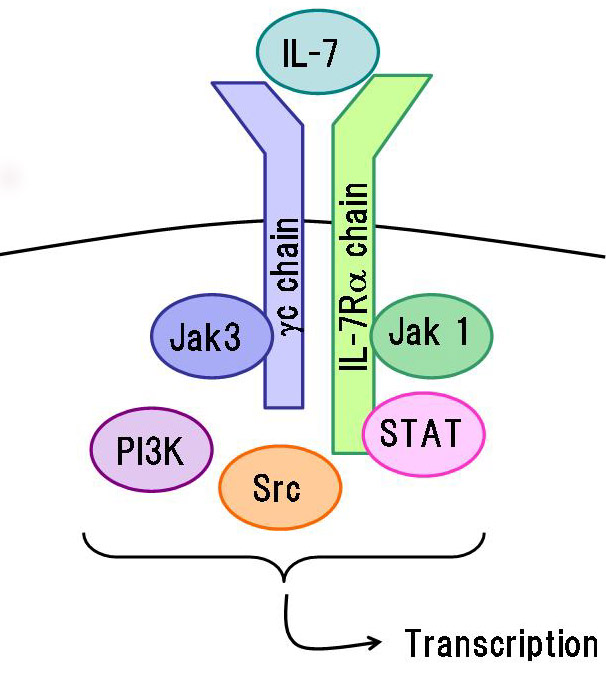
IL-7 receptor and signaling, common γ chain (blue) and IL-7 receptor-α (green)

interleukin 2 receptor, gamma
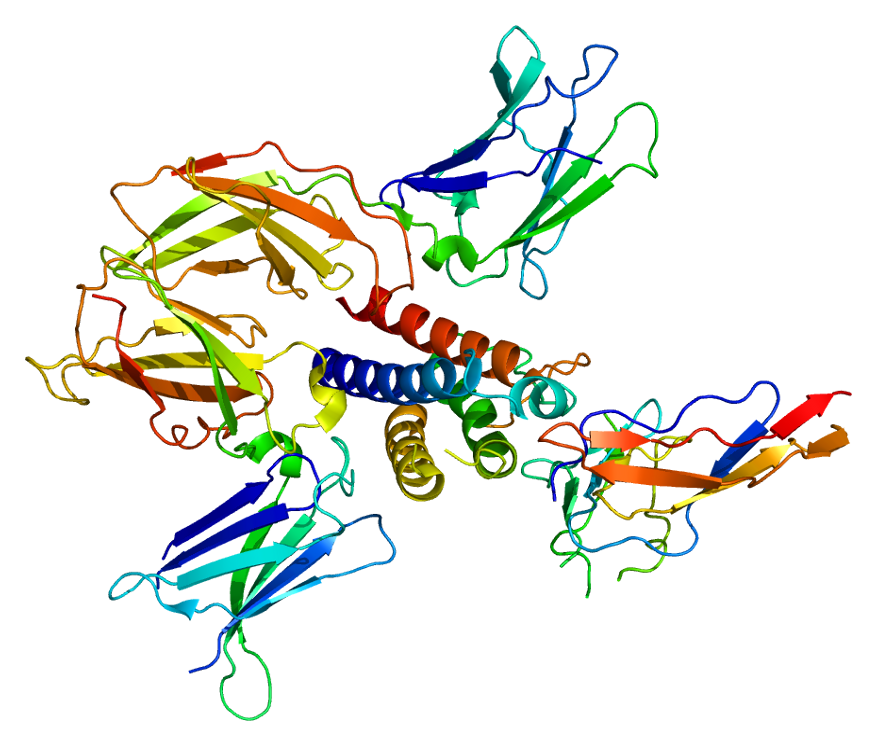

Identifiers
- Symbol: IL2RG
- Alt. symbols: SCIDX1, IMD4, CD132
- NCBI gene: 3561
- HGNC: 6010
- OMIM: 308380
- RefSeq: NM_000206
- UniProt: P31785

Other data
- Locus: Chr. X q13
Search for
- Structures: Swiss-model
- Domains: InterPro

The interleukin-7 receptor is a protein found on the surface of cells. It is made up of two different smaller protein chains - i.e. it is a heterodimer, and consists of two subunits, interleukin-7 receptor-α (CD127) and common-γ chain receptor (CD132). The common-γ chain receptors is shared with various cytokines, including interleukin-2, -4, -9, and -15. Interleukin-7 receptor is expressed on various cell types, including naive and memory T cells and many others.

== Function ==
Interleukin-7 receptor has been shown to play a critical role in the development of immune cells called lymphocytes - specifically in a process known as V(D)J recombination. This protein is also found to control the accessibility of a region of the genome that contains the T-cell receptor gamma gene, by STAT5 and histone acetylation. Knockout studies in mice suggest that blocking apoptosis is an essential function of this protein during differentiation and activation of T lymphocytes. Functional defects in this protein may be associated with the pathogenesis of severe combined immunodeficiency (SCID).

== Diseases ==
Several diseases are associated with Interleukin-7 receptor including T-cell acute lymphoblastic leukaemia, multiple sclerosis, rheumatoid arthritis and juvenile idiopathic arthritis.

== See also ==
- Cluster of differentiation
