= STAT3 =

Protein-coding gene in humans

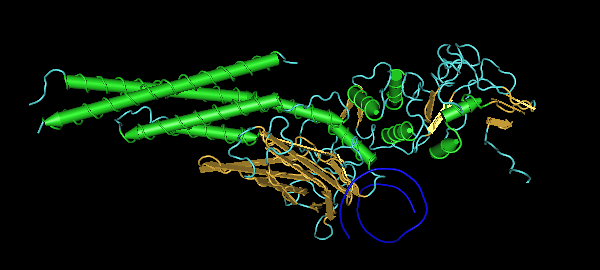

Identifiers
- Aliases: STAT3, ADMIO, APRF, HIES, signal transducer and activator of transcription 3, ADMIO1
- External IDs: OMIM: 102582; MGI: 103038; GeneCards: STAT3
Available structures
PDB	Ortholog search: PDBe RCSB
PDB	List of PDB id codes 5AX3

Gene location (Human)
Chr.	Chromosome 17 (human)
Band	17q21.2	Start	42,313,324 bp
Band	17q21.2	End	42,388,568 bp

Gene location (Mouse)
Chr.	Chromosome 11 (mouse)
Band	11 D|11 63.82 cM	Start	100,775,924 bp
Band	11 D|11 63.82 cM	End	100,830,366 bp
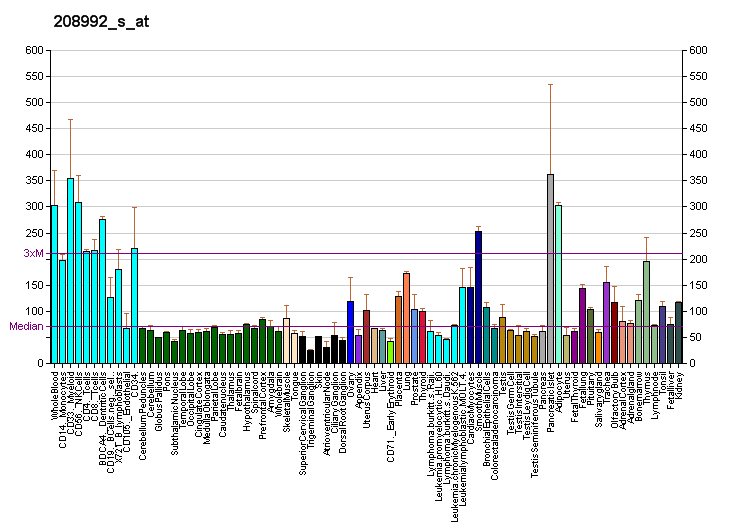

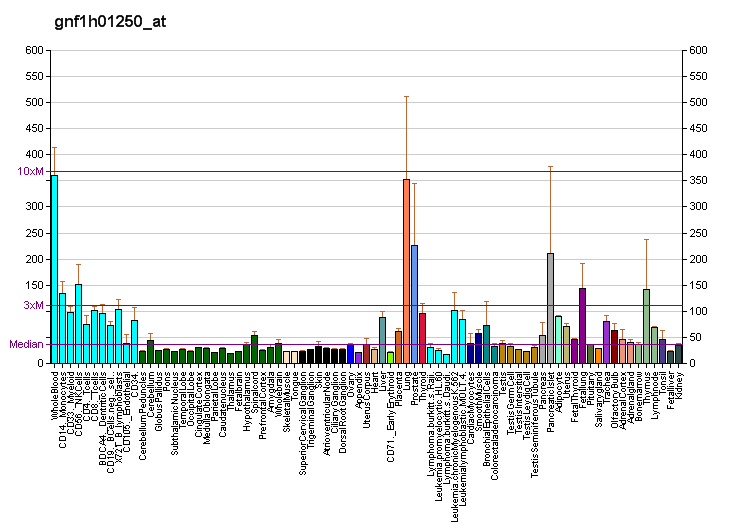

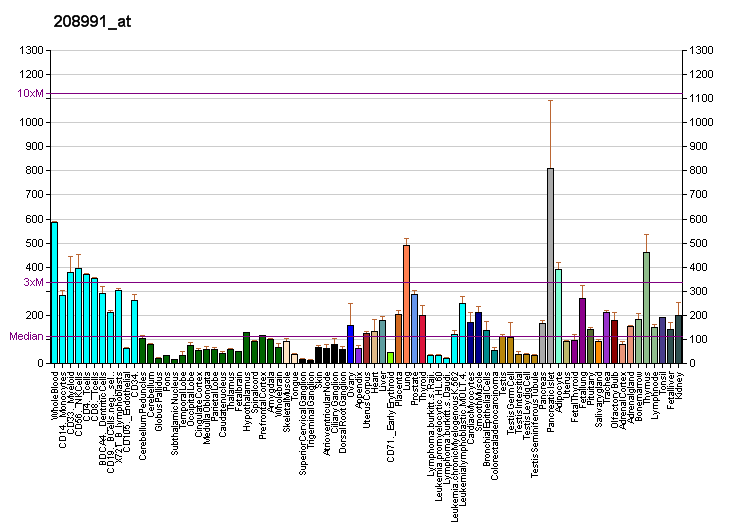
RNA expression pattern
Bgee	Human / Mouse (ortholog); Top expressed in: beta cell; pericardium; lower lobe of lung; lactiferous duct; nipple; right ventricle; upper lobe of lung; upper lobe of left lung; vena cava; epithelium of colon / Top expressed in: right lung lobe; ankle; granulocyte; left lung; decidua; epithelium of stomach; ankle joint; stroma of bone marrow; skin of external ear; tibiofemoral joint; More reference expression data
BioGPS	More reference expression data
Gene ontology
Molecular function	protein dimerization activity; DNA-binding transcription factor activity; DNA-binding transcription activator activity, RNA polymerase II-specific; nuclear receptor activity; protein phosphatase binding; RNA polymerase II cis-regulatory region sequence-specific DNA binding; protein binding; protein kinase binding; DNA binding; sequence-specific DNA binding; chromatin DNA binding; protein homodimerization activity; identical protein binding; DNA-binding transcription factor activity, RNA polymerase II-specific; signal transducer activity; transcription factor binding; CCR5 chemokine receptor binding; glucocorticoid receptor binding
Cellular component	cytoplasm; mitochondrion; nucleus; plasma membrane; nucleoplasm; RNA polymerase II transcription regulator complex; mitochondrial inner membrane; cytosol; postsynaptic density; Schaffer collateral - CA1 synapse; glutamatergic synapse; transcription regulator complex
Biological process	negative regulation of glycolytic process; protein import into nucleus; regulation of transcription by RNA polymerase II; transcription by RNA polymerase II; response to organic substance; positive regulation of gene silencing by miRNA; radial glial cell differentiation; stem cell population maintenance; cellular response to hormone stimulus; regulation of mitochondrial membrane permeability; growth hormone receptor signaling pathway; miRNA-mediated gene silencing by inhibition of translation; eye photoreceptor cell differentiation; positive regulation of metalloendopeptidase activity; temperature homeostasis; cell population proliferation; response to leptin; response to ethanol; positive regulation of Notch signaling pathway; negative regulation of cell population proliferation; response to cytokine; regulation of transcription, DNA-templated; glucose homeostasis; negative regulation of cell death; transcription, DNA-templated; positive regulation of growth factor dependent skeletal muscle satellite cell proliferation; positive regulation of transcription, DNA-templated; negative regulation of hydrogen peroxide biosynthetic process; energy homeostasis; viral process; negative regulation of neuron death; sexual reproduction; phosphorylation; leptin-mediated signaling pathway; cellular response to organic cyclic compound; negative regulation of apoptotic process; negative regulation of transcription by RNA polymerase II; regulation of feeding behavior; nervous system development; positive regulation of ATP biosynthetic process; intracellular receptor signaling pathway; acute-phase response; negative regulation of neuron migration; receptor signaling pathway via JAK-STAT; response to estradiol; response to organic cyclic compound; eating behavior; somatic stem cell population maintenance; regulation of multicellular organism growth; ageing; response to peptide hormone; cellular response to leptin stimulus; regulation of cell cycle; astrocyte differentiation; signal transduction; positive regulation of transcription by RNA polymerase II; growth hormone receptor signaling pathway via JAK-STAT; positive regulation of gene expression; negative regulation of stem cell differentiation; positive regulation of cell population proliferation; mRNA transcription by RNA polymerase II; inflammatory response; positive regulation of erythrocyte differentiation; T-helper 17 cell lineage commitment; positive regulation of pri-miRNA transcription by RNA polymerase II; positive regulation of tyrosine phosphorylation of STAT protein; interleukin-15-mediated signaling pathway; interleukin-7-mediated signaling pathway; positive regulation of angiogenesis; positive regulation of vascular endothelial cell proliferation; cytokine-mediated signaling pathway; interleukin-21-mediated signaling pathway; interleukin-23-mediated signaling pathway; interleukin-6-mediated signaling pathway; interleukin-27-mediated signaling pathway; interleukin-35-mediated signaling pathway; cellular response to cytokine stimulus; interleukin-9-mediated signaling pathway; modulation of chemical synaptic transmission; postsynapse to nucleus signaling pathway; negative regulation of autophagy; positive regulation of cell migration; positive regulation of NF-kappaB transcription factor activity; defense response; regulation of cell population proliferation
Sources:Amigo / QuickGO
Orthologs
Databases	NCBI: entry; OMA: entry
Species	Human	Mouse
Entrez	6774	20848
Ensembl	ENSG00000168610	ENSMUSG00000004040
UniProt	P40763	P42227
RefSeq (mRNA)	NM_003150; NM_139276; NM_213662; NM_001369512; NM_001369513 NM_001369514; NM_001369516; NM_001369517; NM_001369518; NM_001369519; NM_001369520	NM_011486; NM_213659; NM_213660
RefSeq (protein)	NP_003141; NP_644805; NP_998827; NP_001356441; NP_001356442 NP_001356443; NP_001356445; NP_001356446; NP_001356447; NP_001356448; NP_001356449	NP_035616; NP_998824; NP_998825
Location (UCSC)	Chr 17: 42.31 – 42.39 Mb	Chr 11: 100.78 – 100.83 Mb
PubMed search
- Wikidata
View/Edit Human	View/Edit Mouse

Signal transducer and activator of transcription 3 (STAT3) is a transcription factor which in humans is encoded by the STAT3 gene. It is a member of the STAT protein family.

== Function ==
STAT3 is a member of the STAT protein family. In response to cytokines and growth factors, STAT3 is phosphorylated by receptor-associated Janus kinases (JAK), forms homo- or heterodimers, and translocates to the cell nucleus where it acts as a transcription activator. Specifically, STAT3 becomes activated after phosphorylation of tyrosine 705 in response to such ligands as interferons, epidermal growth factor (EGF), interleukin (IL-)5 and IL-6. Additionally, activation of STAT3 may occur via phosphorylation of serine 727 by mitogen-activated protein kinases (MAPK) and through c-src non-receptor tyrosine kinase. STAT3 mediates the expression of a variety of genes in response to cell stimuli, and thus plays a key role in many cellular processes such as cell growth and apoptosis.

STAT3-deficient mouse embryos cannot develop beyond embryonic day 7, when gastrulation begins. It appears that at these early stages of development, STAT3 activation is required for self-renewal of embryonic stem cells (ESCs). Indeed, LIF, which is supplied to murine ESC cultures to maintain their undifferentiated state, can be omitted if STAT3 is activated through some other means.

STAT3 is essential for the differentiation of the TH17 helper T cells, which have been implicated in a variety of autoimmune diseases. During viral infection, mice lacking STAT3 in T-cells display impairment in the ability to generate T-follicular helper (Tfh) cells and fail to maintain antibody based immunity.

STAT3 caused upregulation in E-selectin, a factor in metastasis of cancers.

Hyperactivation of STAT3 occurs in COVID-19 infection and other viral infections.

== Clinical significance ==
Loss-of-function mutations in the STAT3 gene result in hyperimmunoglobulin E syndrome, associated with recurrent infections as well as disordered bone and tooth development.

Gain-of-function mutations in the STAT3 gene have been reported to cause multi-organ early onset auto-immune diseases; such as thyroid disease, diabetes, intestinal inflammation, and low blood counts, while constitutive STAT3 activation is associated with various human cancers and commonly suggests poor prognosis. It has anti-apoptotic as well as proliferative effects.

STAT3 can promote oncogenesis by being constitutively active through various pathways as mentioned elsewhere. A tumor suppressor role of STAT3 has also been reported. In the report on human glioblastoma tumor, or brain cancer, STAT3 was shown to have an oncogenic or a tumor suppressor role depending upon the mutational background of the tumor. A direct connection between the PTEN-Akt-FOXO axis (suppressive) and the leukemia inhibitory factor receptor beta (LIFRbeta)-STAT3 signaling pathway (oncogenic) was shown. Overactivation of STAT3 promotes tumor survival and reduces sensitivity to temozolomide (TMZ), the standard chemotherapy for this cancer. Systemic inhibition of STAT3, however, risks immune dysregulation, complicating its therapeutic targeting. Recent studies highlight a non-coding RNA transcribed from a STAT3 enhancer region, termed TMZR1-eRNA, which regulates STAT3 expression. Silencing TMZR1-eRNA reduces STAT3 mRNA and protein levels, sensitizing glioblastoma cells to TMZ-induced cell death. Mechanistically, TMZR1-eRNA enhances STAT3 promoter activity, creating a feedback loop that sustains STAT3 expression. Importantly, TMZR1-eRNA expression is minimal in healthy brain tissue and peripheral blood cells, suggesting its suppression could offer a tumor-specific strategy to overcome chemoresistance with reduced off-target effects compared to direct STAT3 inhibitors

Increased activity of STAT3 in cancer cells, leads to changes in the function of protein complexes that control expression of inflammatory genes, with result profound change in the secretome and the cell phenotypes, their activity in the tumor, and their capacity for metastasis.

== Interactions ==
STAT3 has been shown to interact with:

- AR
- EGFR
- ELP2
- EP300
- HIF1A
- JAK1
- JUN
- KHDRBS1
- KPNA4
- mTOR
- MYOD1
- NCOA1
- NDUFA13
- NFKB1
- NR3C1
- PML
- RAC1
- RELA
- RET
- RPA2
- Src
- STAT1
- Stathmin
- TRIP10

== Ligands ==
Inhibitors

- Napabucasin
- Niclosamide seems to inhibit the STAT3 signalling pathway.
- Nicotinamide (a type of vitamin B_{3}) naturally inhibits STAT3. However NAC (Acetylcysteine) inhibits STAT3 inhibitors.
- Stattic

PROTACs

- SD36
