= Stattic =

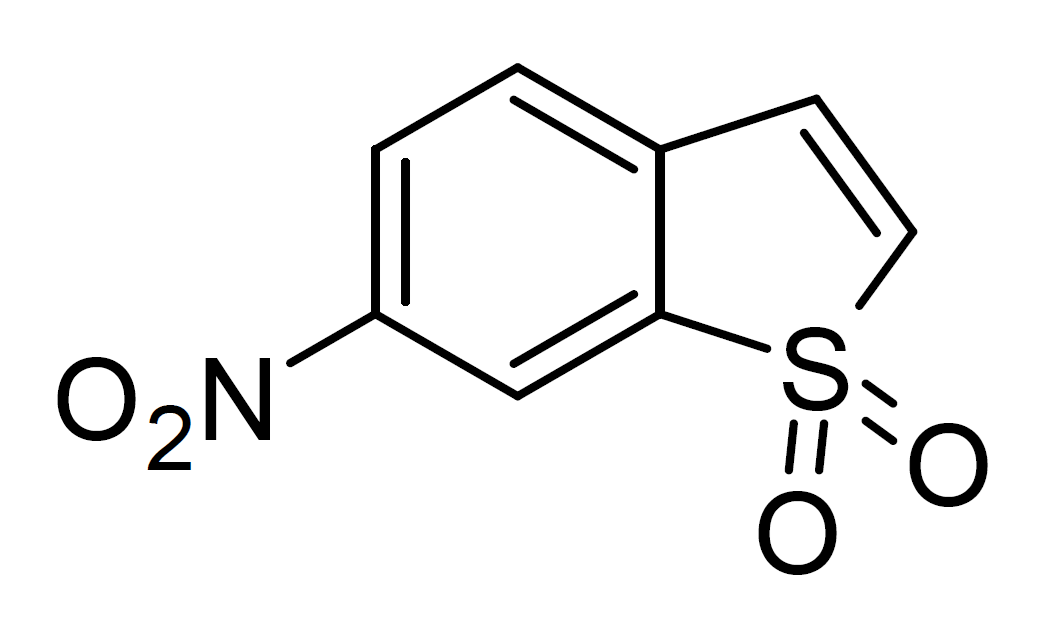

Clinical data
- Drug class: STAT3 inhibitor

Identifiers
- IUPAC name: 6-nitro-1-benzothiophene 1,1-dioxide
- CAS Number: 19983-44-9
- PubChem CID: 2779853
- ChemSpider: 2060075
- ChEBI: CHEBI:86989
- ChEMBL: ChEMBL1337170
- CompTox Dashboard (EPA): DTXSID70381575

Chemical and physical data
- Formula: C_{8}H_{5}NO_{4}S
- Molar mass: 211.19 g·mol^{−1}
- 3D model (JSmol): Interactive image
- SMILES: C1=CC(=CC2=C1C=CS2(=O)=O)[N+](=O)[O-]
- InChI: InChI=1S/C8H5NO4S/c10-9(11)7-2-1-6-3-4-14(12,13)8(6)5-7/h1-5H; Key:ZRRGOUHITGRLBA-UHFFFAOYSA-N

Stattic is a drug that acts as an inhibitor of the transcription factor protein STAT3. It has potential applications in the treatment of cancer and autoimmune disorders.
