= Napabucasin =

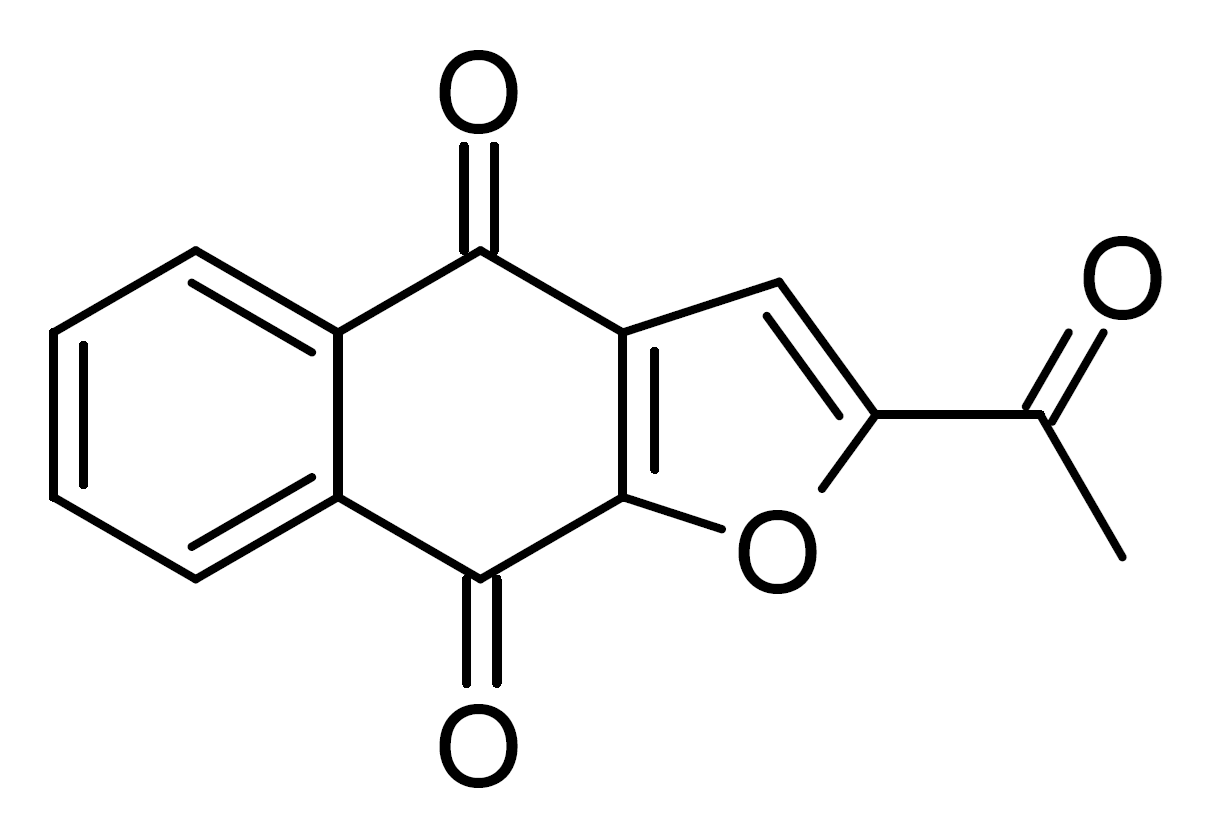

Clinical data
- Drug class: STAT3 inhibitor

Identifiers
- IUPAC name: 2-acetylbenzo[f][1]benzofuran-4,9-dione
- CAS Number: 83280-65-3
- PubChem CID: 10331844
- UNII: Z1HHM49K7O

Chemical and physical data
- Formula: C_{14}H_{8}O_{4}
- Molar mass: 240.214 g·mol^{−1}
- 3D model (JSmol): Interactive image
- SMILES: CC(=O)C1=CC2=C(O1)C(=O)C3=CC=CC=C3C2=O
- InChI: InChI=1S/C14H8O4/c1-7(15)11-6-10-12(16)8-4-2-3-5-9(8)13(17)14(10)18-11/h2-6H,1H3; Key:DPHUWDIXHNQOSY-UHFFFAOYSA-N

Napabucasin (BBI-608) is a natural product found in the inner bark of the tree Handroanthus impetiginosus, that acts as an inhibitor of the transcription factor protein STAT3. It has potential applications in the treatment of cancer, acting as a stemness inhibitor.

== See also ==
- Doxorubicin
- HU-331
