= Decernotinib =

Chemical compound

Identifiers
- IUPAC name: (2R)-2-Methyl-2-[[2-(1H-pyrrolo[2,3-b]pyridin-3-yl)pyrimidin-4-yl]amino]-N-(2,2,2-trifluoroethyl)butanamide
- CAS Number: 944842-54-0
- PubChem CID: 59422203
- ChemSpider: 30843790
- UNII: MZK2GP0RHK
- KEGG: D10585
- CompTox Dashboard (EPA): DTXSID70241504

Chemical and physical data
- Formula: C_{18}H_{19}F_{3}N_{6}O
- Molar mass: 392.386 g·mol^{−1}
- 3D model (JSmol): Interactive image
- SMILES: CC[C@](C)(C(=O)NCC(F)(F)F)NC1=NC(=NC=C1)C2=CNC3=C2C=CC=N3
- InChI: InChI=1S/C18H19F3N6O/c1-3-17(2,16(28)25-10-18(19,20)21)27-13-6-8-23-15(26-13)12-9-24-14-11(12)5-4-7-22-14/h4-9H,3,10H2,1-2H3,(H,22,24)(H,25,28)(H,23,26,27)/t17-/m1/s1; Key:ASUGUQWIHMTFJL-QGZVFWFLSA-N

Decernotinib is an inhibitor of Janus kinase 3 (JAK3) discovered through a process of inhouse screening of a chemical compound library. Decernotinib also had the name VX-509 in development phase. It is an experimental drug with high selectivity for JAK3, which demonstrates good efficacy in vivo in the rat host versus graft model (HvG). It has been studied in clinical trials at Vertex Pharmaceuticals, and while it was not approved for clinical use it continues to be used for research.
