= STAT inhibitors =

Drug class

STAT inhibitors are drugs which target signal transducer and activator of transcription (STAT) proteins, a family of cytoplasmic induction factors. Inhibitors of STAT proteins are being developed for use in cancer therapy.

== See also ==
- JAK-STAT signaling pathway
