= CRLF2 =

Protein-coding gene in humans

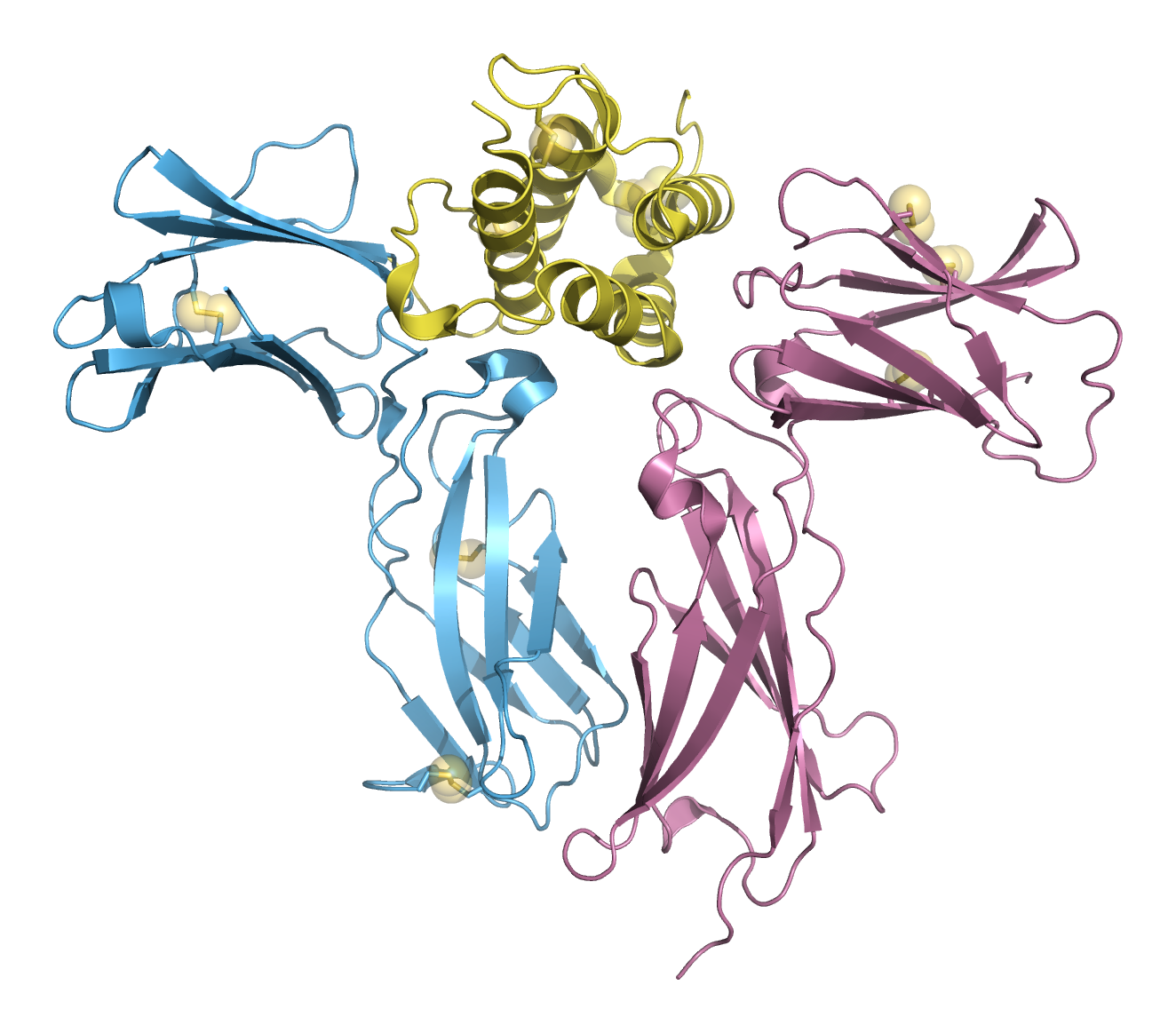

Identifiers
- Aliases: CRLF2, CRL2, CRLF2Y, TSLPR, cytokine receptor-like factor 2, cytokine receptor like factor 2
- External IDs: OMIM: 300357, 400023; MGI: 1889506; GeneCards: CRLF2
Available structures
| PDB | Ortholog search: PDBe RCSB |
| PDB | List of PDB id codes 4NN5, 4NN6, 4NN7 |

Gene location (Human)
| Chr. | X chromosome (human) |
| Band | Xp22.23;Yp11.32 | Start | 1,187,549 bp |
| Band | Xp22.23;Yp11.32 | End | 1,212,723 bp |

Gene location (Mouse)
| Chr. | Chromosome 5 (mouse) |
| Band | 5|5 F | Start | 109,702,575 bp |
| Band | 5|5 F | End | 109,706,859 bp |
RNA expression pattern
| Bgee | Human / Mouse (ortholog); Top expressed in: testicle; appendix; gallbladder; palpebral conjunctiva; smooth muscle tissue; rectum; bone marrow; right lung; urinary bladder; upper lobe of left lung / Top expressed in: granulocyte; stroma of bone marrow; mesenteric lymph nodes; ankle; subcutaneous adipose tissue; fossa; substantia nigra; decidua; barrel cortex; tunica media of zone of aorta; More reference expression data |
| BioGPS | n/a |
Gene ontology
| Molecular function | cytokine receptor activity; cytokine binding |
| Cellular component | membrane; integral component of membrane; extracellular region; plasma membrane; external side of plasma membrane; receptor complex |
| Biological process | interleukin-7-mediated signaling pathway; positive regulation of cell population proliferation; cytokine-mediated signaling pathway; positive regulation of mast cell activation; positive regulation of receptor signaling pathway via STAT |
Sources:Amigo / QuickGO
Orthologs
| Databases | NCBI: entry; OMA: entry |
| Species | Human | Mouse |
| Entrez | 64109 | 57914 |
| Ensembl | ENSG00000205755 | ENSMUSG00000033467 |
| UniProt | Q9HC73 | Q8CII9 |
| RefSeq (mRNA) | NM_001012288; NM_022148 | NM_001164735; NM_016715; NM_001310694 |
| RefSeq (protein) | NP_001012288; NP_071431 | NP_001158207; NP_001297623; NP_057924 |
| Location (UCSC) | Chr X: 1.19 – 1.21 Mb | Chr 5: 109.7 – 109.71 Mb |
| PubMed search |
- Wikidata
| View/Edit Human | View/Edit Mouse |

Cytokine receptor-like factor 2 (also known as TSLP receptor, TSLP-R) is a protein that in humans is encoded by the CRLF2 gene. It forms a ternary signaling complex with TSLP and interleukin-7 receptor-α, capable of stimulating cell proliferation through activation of STAT3, STAT5 and JAK2 pathways and is implicated in the development of the hematopoietic system. Rearrangement of this gene with immunoglobulin heavy chain gene (IGH) (chromosome 14), or with P2Y purinoceptor 8 gene (P2RY8) (chromosome X or Y) is associated with B-progenitor- and Down syndrome- acute lymphoblastic leukemia (ALL).

Cytokine signals are mediated through specific receptor complexes, the components of which are mostly members of the type I cytokine receptor family. Type I cytokine receptors share conserved structural features in their extracellular domain. Receptor complexes are typically heterodimeric, consisting of alpha chains, which provide ligand specificity, and beta (or gamma) chains, which are required for the formation of high-affinity binding sites and signal transduction.
