= Interleukin 7 =

Growth factor secreted by stromal cells in the bone marrow and thymus

IL7
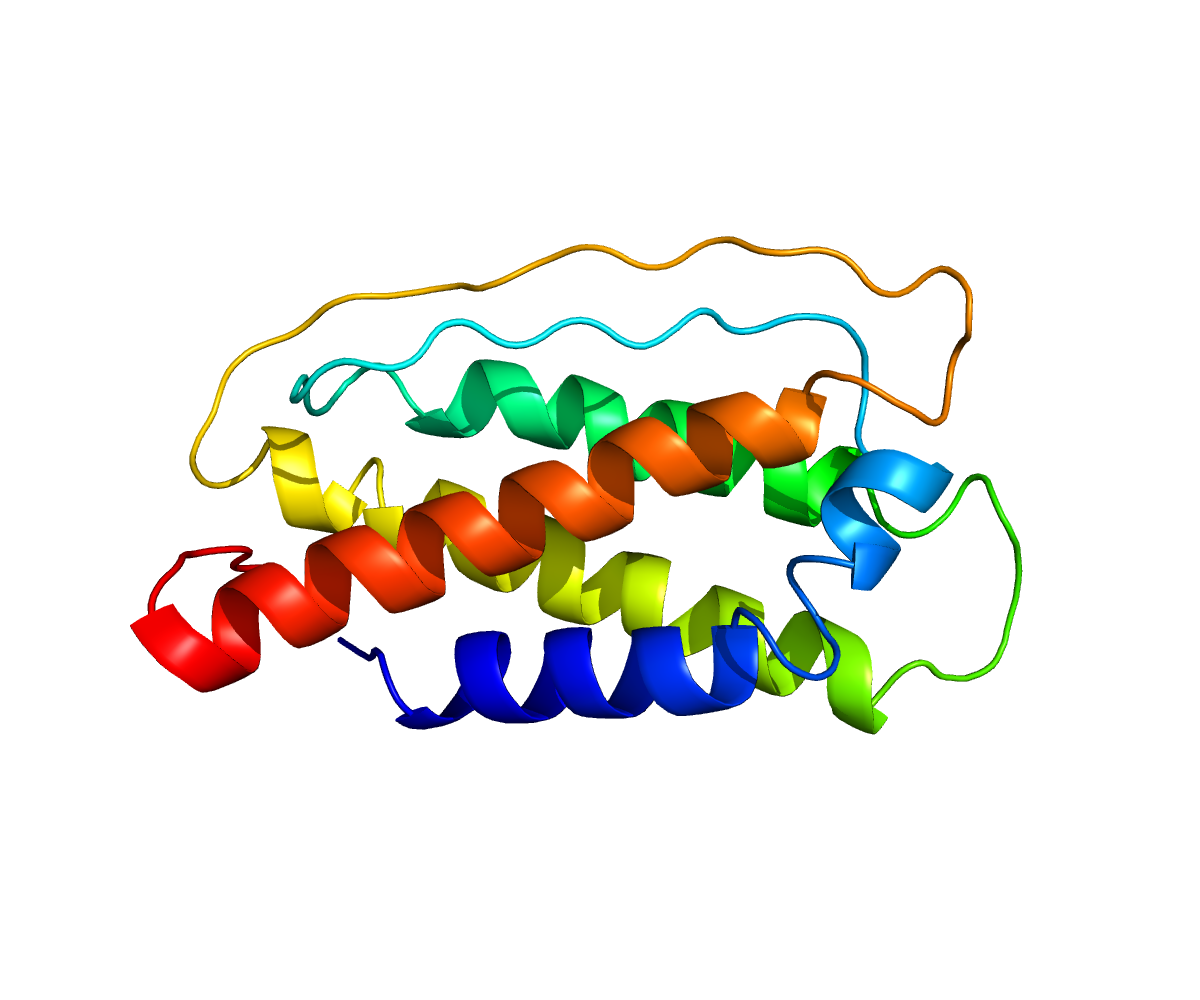

Identifiers
- Aliases: IL7, IL-7, interleukin 7
- External IDs: OMIM: 146660; MGI: 96561; GeneCards: IL7
Available structures
| PDB | Ortholog search: PDBe RCSB |
| PDB | List of PDB id codes 3DI2, 3DI3 |

Gene location (Human)
| Chr. | Chromosome 8 (human) |
| Band | 8q21.13 | Start | 78,675,743 bp |
| Band | 8q21.13 | End | 78,805,523 bp |

Gene location (Mouse)
| Chr. | Chromosome 3 (mouse) |
| Band | 3 A1|3 2.02 cM | Start | 7,635,054 bp |
| Band | 3 A1|3 2.02 cM | End | 7,678,820 bp |
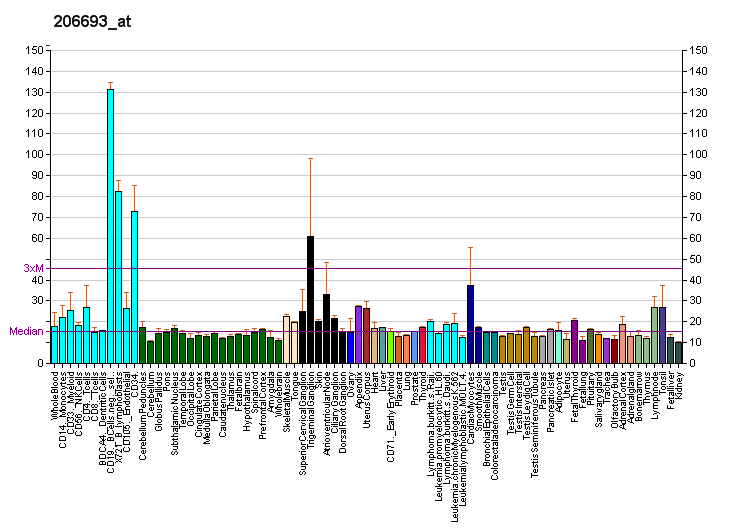
RNA expression pattern
| Bgee | Human / Mouse (ortholog); Top expressed in: sperm; bronchial epithelial cell; testicle; Achilles tendon; jejunal mucosa; lower lobe of lung; caput epididymis; lymph node; right uterine tube; rectum / Top expressed in: secondary oocyte; lumbar spinal ganglion; zygote; primary oocyte; endothelial cell of lymphatic vessel; thymus; mesenteric lymph nodes; left colon; Paneth cell; stroma of bone marrow; More reference expression data |
| BioGPS | More reference expression data |
Gene ontology
| Molecular function | protein binding; interleukin-7 receptor binding; growth factor activity; cytokine receptor binding; cytokine activity |
| Cellular component | extracellular space; extracellular region; collagen-containing extracellular matrix |
| Biological process | negative regulation of catalytic activity; cell-cell signaling; negative regulation of extrinsic apoptotic signaling pathway; positive regulation of organ growth; negative regulation of apoptotic process; bone resorption; humoral immune response; immune response; positive regulation of cell population proliferation; animal organ morphogenesis; regulation of gene expression; homeostasis of number of cells within a tissue; negative regulation of extrinsic apoptotic signaling pathway in absence of ligand; T cell lineage commitment; positive regulation of B cell proliferation; positive regulation of T cell differentiation; interleukin-7-mediated signaling pathway; regulation of signaling receptor activity; positive regulation of cytokine-mediated signaling pathway; cytokine-mediated signaling pathway; positive regulation of chemokine production; regulation of peptidyl-tyrosine phosphorylation; positive regulation of gene expression; positive regulation of B cell differentiation |
Sources:Amigo / QuickGO
Orthologs
| Databases | NCBI: entry; OMA: entry |
| Species | Human | Mouse |
| Entrez | 3574 | 16196 |
| Ensembl | ENSG00000104432 | ENSMUSG00000040329 |
| UniProt | P13232 | P10168 |
| RefSeq (mRNA) | NM_000880; NM_001199886; NM_001199887; NM_001199888 | NM_008371; NM_001313888; NM_001313889; NM_001313890 |
| RefSeq (protein) | NP_000871; NP_001186815; NP_001186816; NP_001186817 | NP_001300817; NP_001300818; NP_001300819; NP_032397 |
| Location (UCSC) | Chr 8: 78.68 – 78.81 Mb | Chr 3: 7.64 – 7.68 Mb |
| PubMed search |
- Wikidata
| View/Edit Human | View/Edit Mouse |

Interleukin 7 (IL-7) is a protein that in humans is encoded by the IL7 gene.

IL-7 is a hematopoietic growth factor secreted by stromal cells in the bone marrow and thymus. It is also produced by keratinocytes, follicular dendritic cells, hepatocytes, neurons, and epithelial cells, but is not produced by normal lymphocytes. A study also demonstrated how the autocrine production of the IL-7 cytokine mediated by T-cell acute lymphoblastic leukemia (T-ALL) can be involved in the oncogenic development of T-ALL and offer novel insights into T-ALL spreading.

== Structure ==
The three-dimensional structure of IL-7 in complex with the ectodomain of IL-7 receptor has been determined using X-ray diffraction.

== Function ==
=== Lymphocyte maturation ===
IL-7 stimulates the differentiation of multipotent (pluripotent) hematopoietic stem cells into lymphoid progenitor cells (as opposed to myeloid progenitor cells where differentiation is stimulated by IL-3). It also stimulates proliferation of all cells in the lymphoid lineage (B cells, T cells and NK cells). It is important for proliferation during certain stages of B-cell maturation, T and NK cell survival, development and homeostasis.

IL-7 is a cytokine important for B and T cell development. This cytokine and the hepatocyte growth factor (HGF) form a heterodimer that functions as a pre-pro-B cell growth-stimulating factor. This cytokine is found to be a cofactor for V(D)J rearrangement of the T cell receptor beta (TCRß) during early T cell development. This cytokine can be produced locally by intestinal epithelial and epithelial goblet cells, and may serve as a regulatory factor for intestinal mucosal lymphocytes. Knockout studies in mice suggested that this cytokine plays an essential role in lymphoid cell survival.

=== IL-7 signaling ===
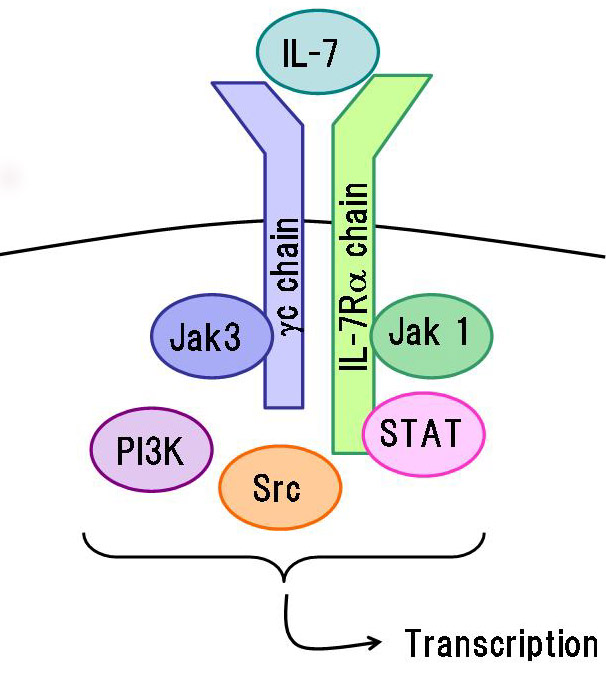
IL-7 receptor and signaling, common γ chain (blue) and IL-7 receptor-α (green)

IL-7 binds to the IL-7 receptor, a heterodimer consisting of Interleukin-7 receptor alpha and common gamma chain receptor. Binding results in a cascade of signals important for T-cell development within the thymus and survival within the periphery. Knockout mice which genetically lack IL-7 receptor exhibit thymic atrophy, arrest of T-cell development at the double positive stage, and severe lymphopenia. Administration of IL-7 to mice results in an increase in recent thymic emigrants, increases in B and T cells, and increased recovery of T cells after cyclophosphamide administration or after bone marrow transplantation.

== Disease ==
=== Cancer ===
IL-7 promotes hematological malignancies (acute lymphoblastic leukemia, T cell lymphoma).

=== Viral Infections ===
Elevated levels of IL-7 have also been detected in the plasma of HIV-infected patients.

== Clinical application ==
IL-7 as an immunotherapy agent has been examined in many pre-clinical animal studies and more recently in human clinical trials for various malignancies and during HIV infection.

=== Cancer ===
Recombinant IL-7 has been safely administered to patients in several phase I and II clinical trials. A human study of IL-7 in patients with cancer demonstrated that administration of this cytokine can transiently disrupt the homeostasis of both CD8+ and CD4+ T cells with a commensurate decrease in the percentage of CD4+CD25+Foxp3+ T regulatory cells. No objective cancer regression was observed, however a dose limiting toxicity (DLT) was not reached in this study due to the development of neutralizing antibodies against the recombinant cytokine.

=== HIV infection ===
Associated with antiretroviral therapy, IL-7 administration decreased local and systemic inflammations in patients that had incomplete T-cell reconstitution. These results suggest that IL-7 therapy can possibly improve the quality of life of those patients.

=== Transplantation ===
IL-7 could also be beneficial in improving immune recovery after allogenic stem cell transplant.
