= STAT5A =

Protein-coding gene in the species Homo sapiens

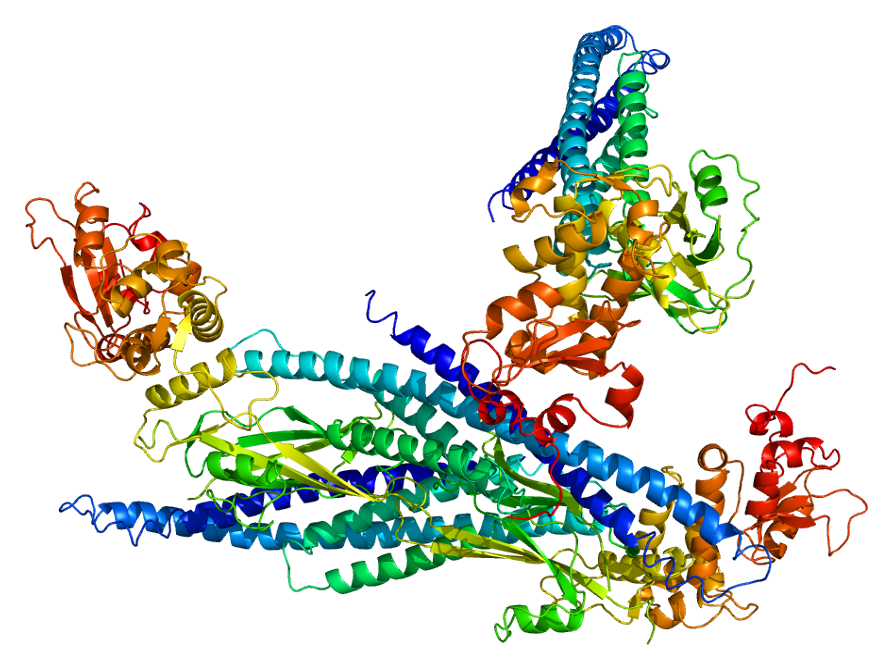

Identifiers
- Aliases: STAT5A, MGF, STAT5, signal transducer and activator of transcription 5A
- External IDs: OMIM: 601511; MGI: 103036; GeneCards: STAT5A
Available structures
PDB	Ortholog search: PDBe RCSB
PDB	List of PDB id codes 1Y1U

Gene location (Human)
Chr.	Chromosome 17 (human)
Band	17q21.2	Start	42,287,547 bp
Band	17q21.2	End	42,311,943 bp

Gene location (Mouse)
Chr.	Chromosome 11 (mouse)
Band	11 D|11 63.77 cM	Start	100,750,177 bp
Band	11 D|11 63.77 cM	End	100,775,995 bp
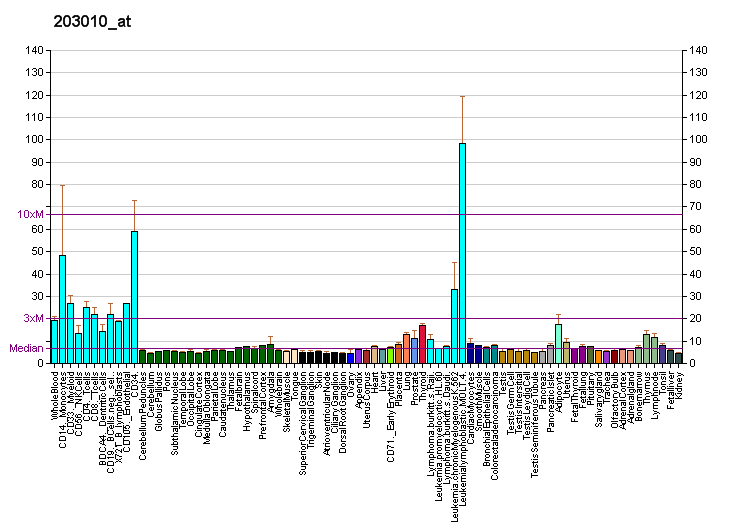
RNA expression pattern
Bgee	Human / Mouse (ortholog); Top expressed in: granulocyte; monocyte; left adrenal cortex; right adrenal cortex; subcutaneous adipose tissue; tendon of biceps brachii; blood; gastric mucosa; appendix; lymph node / Top expressed in: lactiferous gland; seminal vesicula; Ileal epithelium; thymus; brown adipose tissue; cumulus cell; perirhinal cortex; parotid gland; granulocyte; choroid plexus of fourth ventricle; More reference expression data
BioGPS	More reference expression data
Gene ontology
Molecular function	DNA binding; protein binding; DNA-binding transcription factor activity; protein tyrosine kinase activity; DNA-binding transcription factor activity, RNA polymerase II-specific; RNA polymerase II cis-regulatory region sequence-specific DNA binding; DNA-binding transcription activator activity, RNA polymerase II-specific
Cellular component	nucleus; nucleoplasm; cytoplasm; cytosol
Biological process	creatinine metabolic process; positive regulation of endothelial cell proliferation; receptor signaling pathway via JAK-STAT; transcription, DNA-templated; signal transduction; valine metabolic process; creatine metabolic process; regulation of transcription by RNA polymerase II; positive regulation of blood vessel endothelial cell migration; fatty acid metabolic process; taurine metabolic process; succinate metabolic process; regulation of multicellular organism growth; citrate metabolic process; oxaloacetate metabolic process; regulation of transcription, DNA-templated; allantoin metabolic process; isoleucine metabolic process; lactation; 2-oxoglutarate metabolic process; peptidyl-tyrosine phosphorylation; interleukin-7-mediated signaling pathway; growth hormone receptor signaling pathway via JAK-STAT; interleukin-15-mediated signaling pathway; cytokine-mediated signaling pathway; interleukin-2-mediated signaling pathway; interleukin-9-mediated signaling pathway; reelin-mediated signaling pathway; defense response; regulation of cell population proliferation; response to peptide hormone; positive regulation of transcription by RNA polymerase II
Sources:Amigo / QuickGO
Orthologs
Databases	NCBI: entry; OMA: entry
Species	Human	Mouse
Entrez	6776	20850
Ensembl	ENSG00000126561	ENSMUSG00000004043
UniProt	P42229	P42230
RefSeq (mRNA)	NM_001288718; NM_001288719; NM_001288720; NM_003152	NM_001164062; NM_011488; NM_001362680
RefSeq (protein)	NP_001275647; NP_001275648; NP_001275649; NP_003143	NP_001157534; NP_035618; NP_001349609
Location (UCSC)	Chr 17: 42.29 – 42.31 Mb	Chr 11: 100.75 – 100.78 Mb
PubMed search
- Wikidata
View/Edit Human	View/Edit Mouse

Signal transducer and activator of transcription 5A is a protein that in humans is encoded by the STAT5A gene. STAT5A orthologs have been identified in several placentals for which complete genome data are available.

== Structure ==
STAT5a shares the same six functional domains as the other members of the STAT family. It contains 20 amino acids unique to its C-terminal domain and is 96% similar to its homolog, STAT5b. The six functional domains and their corresponding amino acid positions are as follows:

- N-Terminal domain (aa1-144): stabilized interactions to form tetramers
- Coiled-coil domain (aa145-330): interacts with chaperones and facilitates protein-protein interactions for transcriptional regulation
- DNA binding domain (aa331-496): permits binding to consensus gamma-interferon activation sequence (GAS)
- Linker domain (aa497-592): stabilizes DNA binding
- Src Homology 2 domain (aa593-685): mediates receptor-specific recruitment and STAT dimerization via phosphorylated tyrosine residue
- Transcriptional activation domain (aa702-794): interacts with critical co-activators

In addition to the six functional domains, specific amino acids have been identified as key mediators of STAT5a function. Phosphorylation of tyrosine 694 and glycosylation of threonine 92 are important for STAT5a activity. Mutation of serine 710 to phenylalanine results in constitutive activation.

== Function ==
The protein encoded by this gene is a member of the STAT family of transcription factors. In response to cytokines and growth factors, STAT family members are phosphorylated by the receptor associated kinases, and then form homo- or heterodimers that translocate to the cell nucleus where they act as transcription activators. This protein is activated by, and mediates the responses of many cell ligands, such as IL2, IL3, IL7 GM-CSF, erythropoietin, thrombopoietin, and different growth hormones. Activation of this protein in myeloma and lymphoma associated with a TEL/JAK2 gene fusion is independent of cell stimulus and has been shown to be essential for the tumorigenesis. The mouse counterpart of this gene is found to induce the expression of BCL2L1/BCL-X(L), which suggests the antiapoptotic function of this gene in cells. It also transduces prolactin signals to the milk protein genes and is necessary for mammary gland development.

== Clinical signficance ==
Many studies have indicated a key role of STAT5a in leukemia, breast, colon, head and neck, and prostate cancer. Until recently, the unique characteristics and function of STAT5a in these cancers have not been delineated from STAT5b, and more research into their differential behavior is warranted. Because of its integral role in immune cell development, STAT5a may contribute to tumor development by compromising immune surveillance.

STAT5a expression has been studied closely in prostate and breast cancer, and has only recently shown some promise with colorectal and head and neck cancer. Unphosphorylated or inactive STAT5a may suppress tumor growth in colorectal cancer and active STAT5a expression in premalignant and tumor lesions has shown potential as a prognostic marker in oral squamous cell carcinoma.

=== Prostate cancer ===
STAT5a is involved in the maintenance of integrated prostate epithelial structure and has been shown to be critical for cell viability and tumor growth. Stat5a/b is persistently active in prostate cancer cells and inhibition of STAT5a/b has resulted in large scale apoptotic death, although the specific role of STAT5a and distribution of activity remains largely unknown. Prolactin has been known to activate the JAK2-STAT5a/b pathway in both normal and malignant prostate epithelium, but again, the specific activity of STAT5a remains unknown.

=== Breast cancer ===
In normal tissue, STAT5a mediates effects of prolactin in mammary glands. In breast cancer, STAT5a signaling is important for maintain tumor differentiation and suppressing disease progression. Studies originally showed a correlation between high STAT5a expression and tumor differentiation in mice models, but histopathological analysis of human breast cancer tissue has shown a different trend. It was shown that low nuclear levels of STAT5a was associated with unfavorable clinical outcomes and cancer progression independent of STAT5b expression. High STAT5a was suggested to be an inhibitor of invasion and metastasis and therefore an indicator of favorable clinical outcomes. Because of these trends, it has been proposed as a predictor of response to therapies such as anti-estrogen treatment.

=== As a drug target ===
Because the specific activity of STAT5a has not been extensively investigated, most potential therapeutic treatments aim to target STAT5a/b. So far, the only reported potential therapeutic benefit specific to STAT5a has been in colorectal cancer. Inhibition of STAT5a alone would not effect colorectal cancer cells, but when combined with chemotherapies such as cisplatin, it could increase the chemosensitivity of the cancer cells to the drugs. Therapy schemes currently focus on STAT5a/b, targeting and inhibiting different mediators of the JAK2-STAT5 pathway.

== Interactions ==
STAT5A has been shown to interact with:

- CRKL,
- Epidermal growth factor receptor,
- ERBB4,
- Erythropoietin receptor,
- Janus kinase 1,
- Janus kinase 2,
- MAPK1
- NMI, and
- PTPN11.
- CBX5,

== See also ==
- STAT5
