= Macrophage-activating lipopeptide 2 =

Lipopeptide Toll-like receptor 2 and 6 agonist

Names
- IUPAC name S-[(2R)-2,3-bis[(1-oxohexadecyl)oxy]propyl]-L-cysteinylglycyl-L-asparaginyl-L-asparaginyl-L-α-aspartyl-L-α-glutamyl-L-seryl-L-asparaginyl-L-isoleucyl-L-seryl-L-phenylalanyl-L-lysyl-L-α-glutamyl-L-lysine
- Other names MALP-2, S-[2,3-bis(Palmityloxy)-(2R)-propyl-cysteinyl-GNNDESNISFKEK

Identifiers
CAS Number	250718-44-6
3D model (JSmol)	Interactive image
Abbreviations	XGNNDESNISFKEK
ChemSpider	81367986
PubChem CID	134687197
UNII	DZX5IUA94D
- InChI: InChI=1S/C99H167N19O30S/c1-5-8-10-12-14-16-18-20-22-24-26-28-33-43-84(131)147-59-64(148-85(132)44-34-29-27-25-23-21-19-17-15-13-11-9-6-2)60-149-61-65(102)87(133)106-56-80(124)107-71(52-77(103)121)92(138)113-72(53-78(104)122)93(139)115-74(55-83(129)130)94(140)110-68(46-48-82(127)128)90(136)116-75(57-119)96(142)114-73(54-79(105)123)95(141)118-86(62(4)7-3)98(144)117-76(58-120)97(143)112-70(51-63-39-31-30-32-40-63)91(137)108-66(41-35-37-49-100)88(134)109-67(45-47-81(125)126)89(135)111-69(99(145)146)42-36-38-50-101/h30-32,39-40,62,64-76,86,119-120H,5-29,33-38,41-61,100-102H2,1-4H3,(H2,103,121)(H2,104,122)(H2,105,123)(H,106,133)(H,107,124)(H,108,137)(H,109,134)(H,110,140)(H,111,135)(H,112,143)(H,113,138)(H,114,142)(H,115,139)(H,116,136)(H,117,144)(H,118,141)(H,125,126)(H,127,128)(H,129,130)(H,145,146)/t62-,64+,65-,66-,67-,68-,69-,70-,71-,72-,73-,74-,75-,76-,86-/m0/s1 Key: DMWMUMWKGKGSNW-OPMCLZTFSA-N
- SMILES: [C@H](CC1=CC=CC=C1)(C(N[C@H](C(N[C@H](C(N[C@@H](CCCCN)C(O)=O)=O)CCC(O)=O)=O)CCCCN)=O)NC([C@@H](NC([C@@H](NC([C@@H](NC([C@@H](NC([C@@H](NC([C@@H](NC([C@@H](NC([C@@H](NC(CNC([C@H](CSC[C@@H](COC(CCCCCCCCCCCCCCC)=O)OC(CCCCCCCCCCCCCCC)=O)N)=O)=O)CC(N)=O)=O)CC(N)=O)=O)CC(O)=O)=O)CCC(O)=O)=O)CO)=O)CC(N)=O)=O)[C@H](CC)C)=O)CO)=O

Properties
Chemical formula	C_{99}H_{167}N_{19}O_{30}S
Molar mass	2135.59 g·mol^{−1}
- Except where otherwise noted, data are given for materials in their standard state (at 25 °C [77 °F], 100 kPa). Infobox references

Macrophage-activating lipopeptide 2 (MALP-2) is a lipopeptide Toll-like receptor (TLR)-2 and 6 agonist. It is used in immunological research to simulate Mycoplasma bacterial infections and activate immune cells. MALP-2 holds promise as a novel vaccine adjuvant due to its activation of TLRs. It also promotes vascular, bone, and wound healing.

== Structure ==
MALP-2 has the structure S-2,3-bis(palmityloxy)-(2R)-propyl-cysteinyl-GNNDESNISFKEK and is a post-translationally modified CGNNDESNISFKEK peptide in which in the N-terminal cysteine residue sidechain is linked to a diacylglycerol moiety where the two acyl groups are both derived from palmitic acid.

== Discovery ==
MALP-2 was initially named mycoplasma-derived high-molecular-weight material (MDHM) and, as the name suggests, had originally been isolated from Mycoplasma fermentans as an amphiphilic molecule with macropage-activating properties. This discovery helped explain how Mycoplasma bacteria can provoke immune responses despite lacking a cell wall.
