= STAT protein =

Family of intracellular transcription factors

STAT protein, all-alpha domain

Identifiers
- Symbol: STAT_alpha
- Pfam: PF01017
- InterPro: IPR013800
- SCOP2: 1bgf / SCOPe / SUPFAM
Available protein structures:
- PDB: IPR013800 PF01017 (ECOD; PDBsum)
- AlphaFold: IPR013800; PF01017

Domains and covalent modification sites of STAT proteins.

STAT protein, DNA binding domain

Identifiers
- Symbol: STAT_bind
- Pfam: PF02864
- InterPro: IPR013801
- SCOP2: 1bgf / SCOPe / SUPFAM
Available protein structures:
- PDB: IPR013801 PF02864 (ECOD; PDBsum)
- AlphaFold: IPR013801; PF02864

STAT protein, protein interaction domain

Identifiers
- Symbol: STAT_int
- Pfam: PF02865
- InterPro: IPR013799
- SCOP2: 1bgf / SCOPe / SUPFAM
Available protein structures:
- PDB: 1yvlA:2-122, 1bgfA:2-122 IPR013799 PF02865 (ECOD; PDBsum)
- AlphaFold: IPR013799; PF02865

Dictyostelium STAT, coiled coil
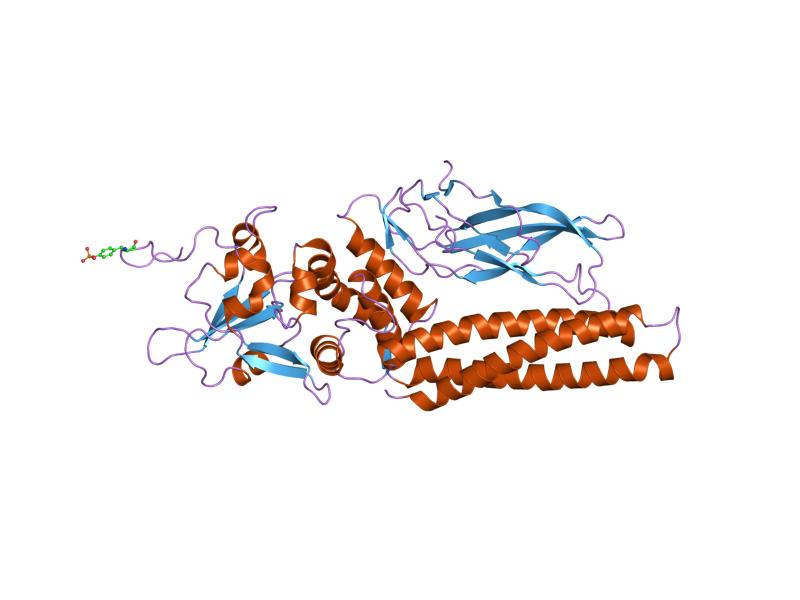
- structure of an activated dictyostelium stat in its DNA-unbound form

Identifiers
- Symbol: Dict-STAT-coil
- Pfam: PF09267
- InterPro: IPR015347
- SCOP2: 1uur / SCOPe / SUPFAM
Available protein structures:
- PDB: IPR015347 PF09267 (ECOD; PDBsum)
- AlphaFold: IPR015347; PF09267

Members of the signal transducer and activator of transcription (STAT) protein family are intracellular transcription factors that mediate many aspects of cellular immunity, proliferation, apoptosis and differentiation. They are primarily activated by membrane receptor-associated Janus kinases (JAK). Dysregulation of this pathway is frequently observed in primary tumors and leads to increased angiogenesis which enhances the survival of tumors and immunosuppression. Gene knockout studies have provided evidence that STAT proteins are involved in the development and function of the immune system and play a role in maintaining immune tolerance and tumor surveillance.

== STAT family ==
The first two STAT proteins were identified in the interferon system. There are seven mammalian STAT family members that have been identified: STAT1, STAT2, STAT3, STAT4, STAT5 (STAT5A and STAT5B), and STAT6. STAT1 homodimers are involved in type II interferon signalling, and bind to the GAS (Interferon-Gamma Activated Sequence) promoter to induce expression of interferon stimulated genes (ISG). In type I interferon signaling, STAT1-STAT2 heterodimer combines with IRF9 (Interferon Response Factor) to form ISGF3 (Interferon Stimulated Gene Factor), which binds to the ISRE (Interferon-Stimulated Response Element) promoter to induce ISG expression.

== Structure ==
All seven STAT proteins share a common structural motif consisting of an N-terminal domain followed by a coiled-coil, DNA-binding domain, linker, Src homology 2 (SH2), and a C-terminal transactivation domain. Much research has focused on elucidating the roles each of these domains play in regulating different STAT isoforms. Both the N-terminal and SH2 domains mediate homo or heterodimer formation, while the coiled-coil domain functions partially as a nuclear localization signal (NLS). Transcriptional activity and DNA association are determined by the transactivation and DNA-binding domains, respectively.

== Activation ==
Extracellular binding of cytokines or growth factors induce activation of receptor-associated Janus kinases, which phosphorylate a specific tyrosine residue within the STAT protein promoting dimerization via their SH2 domains. The phosphorylated dimer is then actively transported to the nucleus via an importin α/β ternary complex. Originally, STAT proteins were described as latent cytoplasmic transcription factors as phosphorylation was thought to be required for nuclear retention. However, unphosphorylated STAT proteins also shuttle between the cytosol and nucleus, and play a role in gene expression. Once STAT reaches the nucleus, it binds to a consensus DNA-recognition motif called gamma-activated sites (GAS) in the promoter region of cytokine-inducible genes and activates transcription. The STAT protein can be dephosphorylated by nuclear phosphatases, which leads to inactivation of STAT and subsequent transport out of the nucleus by an exportin-RanGTP complex.

== See also ==
- JAK-STAT pathway
- DNA-binding protein
- STAT Inhibitors

== Additional images ==
Key steps of the JAK-STAT pathway

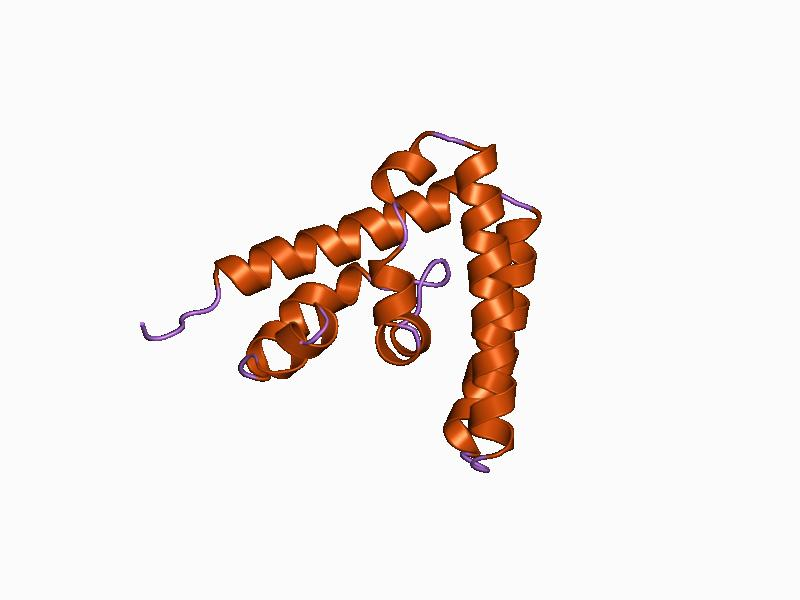
Structure of the amino-terminal protein interaction domain of STAT-4.
