= STAT5 =

Protein family

signal transducer and activator of transcription 5A
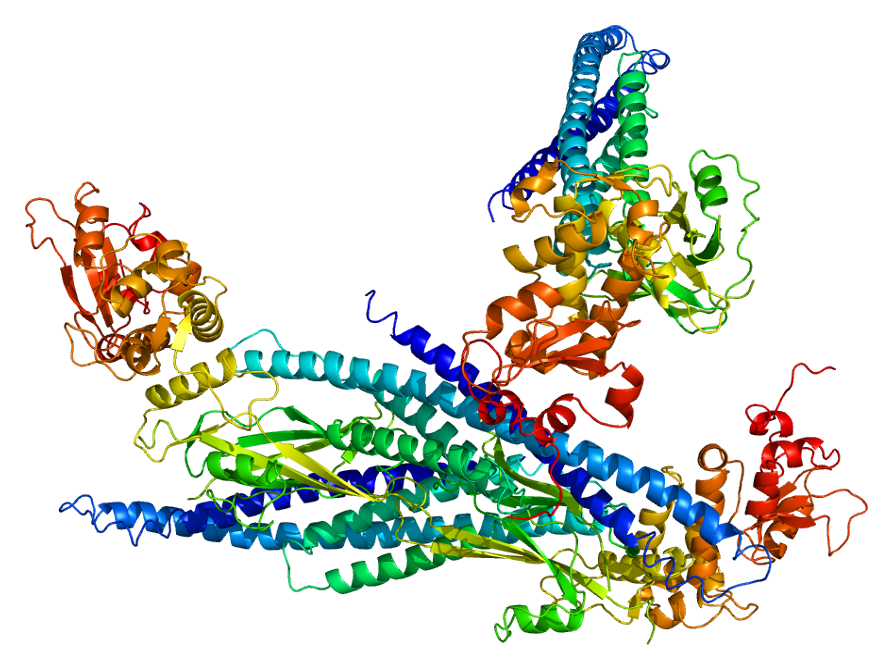
- STAT5A

Identifiers
- Symbol: STAT5A
- Alt. symbols: STAT5
- NCBI gene: 6776
- HGNC: 11366
- OMIM: 601511
- RefSeq: NM_003152
- UniProt: P42229

Other data
- Locus: Chr. 17 q11.2
Search for
- Structures: Swiss-model
- Domains: InterPro

signal transducer and activator of transcription 5B
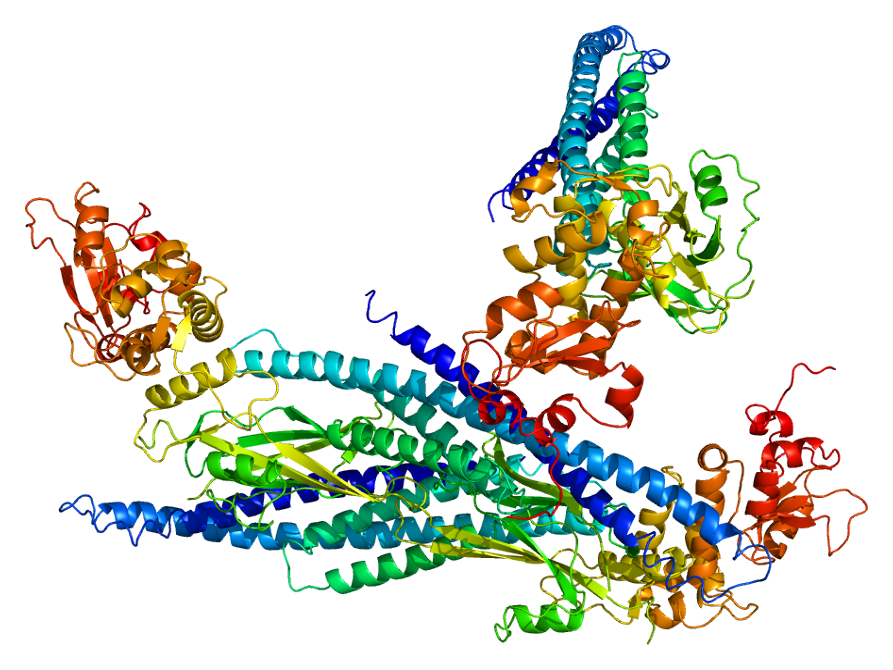
- STAT5B

Identifiers
- Symbol: STAT5B
- NCBI gene: 6777
- HGNC: 11367
- OMIM: 604260
- RefSeq: NM_012448
- UniProt: P51692

Other data
- Locus: Chr. 17 q11.2
Search for
- Structures: Swiss-model
- Domains: InterPro

Signal transducer and activator of transcription 5 (STAT5) refers to two highly related proteins, STAT5A and STAT5B, which are part of the seven-membered STAT family of proteins. Though STAT5A and STAT5B are encoded by separate genes, the proteins are 90% identical at the amino acid level. STAT5 proteins are involved in cytosolic signalling and in mediating the expression of specific genes. Aberrant STAT5 activity has been shown to be closely connected to a wide range of human cancers, and silencing this aberrant activity is an area of active research in medicinal chemistry.

== Activation and function ==
In order to be functional, STAT5 proteins must first be activated. This activation is carried out by kinases associated with transmembrane receptors:

- Ligands binding to these transmembrane receptors on the outside of the cell activate the kinases;
- The stimulated kinases add a phosphate group to a specific tyrosine residue on the receptor;
- STAT5 then binds to these phosphorylated-tyrosines using their SH2 domain (STAT domains illustrated below);
- The bound STAT5 is then phosphorylated by the kinase, the phosphorylation occurring at particular tyrosine residues on the C-terminus of the protein;
- Phosphorylation causes STAT5 to dissociate from the receptor;
- The phosphorylated STAT5 finally goes on to form either homodimers, STAT5-STAT5, or heterodimers, STAT5-STATX, with other STAT proteins. The SH2 domains of the STAT5 proteins are once again used for this dimerization. STAT5 can also form homo-tetramers, usually in concert with the histone methyltransferase EZH2, and act as a transcriptional repressor.

STAT5 activation.

In the activation pathway illustrated to the left, the ligand involved is a cytokine and the specific kinase taking part in activation is JAK. The dimerized STAT5 represents the active form of the protein, which is ready for translocation into the nucleus.

Once in the nucleus, the dimers bind to STAT5 response elements, inducing transcription of specific sets of genes. Upregulation of gene expression by STAT5 dimers has been observed for genes dealing with:

- Controlled cell growth and division, or cell proliferation
- Programmed cell death, or apoptosis
- Cell specialization, or differentiation and
- Inflammation.

Activated STAT5 dimers are, however, short-lived and the dimers are made to undergo rapid deactivation. Deactivation may be carried out by a direct pathway, removing the phosphate groups using phosphatases like PIAS or SHP-2 for example, or by an indirect pathway, which involves reducing cytokine signalling.

== STAT5 and cancer ==
STAT5 has been found to be constitutively phosphorylated in cancer cells, implying that the protein is always present in its active form. This constant activation is brought about either by mutations or by aberrant expressions of cell signalling, resulting in poor regulation, or complete lack of control, of the activation of transcription for genes influenced by STAT5. This leads to constant and increased expression of these genes. For example, mutations may lead to increased expression of anti-apoptotic genes, the products of which actively prevent cell death. The constant presence of these products preserves the cell in spite of it having become cancerous, causing the cell to eventually become malignant.

=== Treatment approaches ===
Attempts at treatment for cancer cells with constitutively phosphorylated STAT5 have included both indirect and direct inhibition of STAT5 activity. While more medicinal work has been done in indirect inhibition, this approach can lead to increased toxicity in cells and can also result in non-specific effects, both of which are better handled by direct inhibition.

Indirect inhibition targets kinases associated with STAT5, or targets proteases that carry out terminal truncation of proteins. Different inhibitors have been designed to target different kinases:

- Inhibition of BCR/ABl constitutes the basis of the functioning of drugs like imatinib
- Inhibition of FLT3 is carried out by drugs like lestaurtinib
- Inhibition of JAK2 is carried out by the drug CYT387, which was successful in preclinical trials and is currently undergoing clinical trials.

Domains of STAT proteins

Direct inhibition of STAT5 activity makes use of small molecule inhibitors that prevent STAT5 from properly binding to DNA or prevent proper dimerization. The inhibiting of DNA binding utilizes RNA interference, antisense oligodeoxynucleotide, and short hairpin RNA. The inhibition of proper dimerization, on the other hand, is brought about by the use of small molecules that target the SH2 domain. Recent work on drug development in the latter field have proved particularly effective.
