= Interleukin-7 receptor-α =

Protein-coding gene in the species Homo sapiens

IL7R
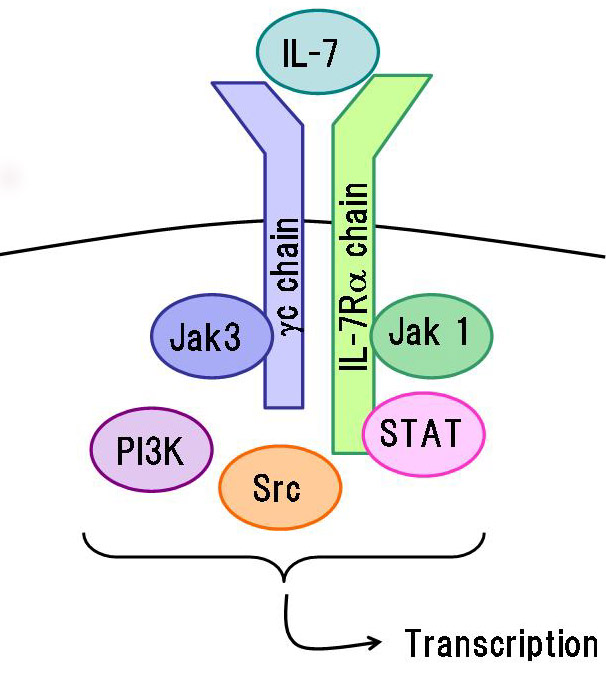

Identifiers
- Aliases: IL7R, CD127, CDW127, IL-7R-alpha, IL7RA, ILRA, Interleukin-7 receptor-α, interleukin 7 receptor
- External IDs: OMIM: 146661; MGI: 96562; GeneCards: IL7R
Available structures
| PDB | Ortholog search: PDBe RCSB |
| PDB | List of PDB id codes 3DI2, 3DI3, 3UP1 |

Gene location (Human)
| Chr. | Chromosome 5 (human) |
| Band | 5p13.2 | Start | 35,852,695 bp |
| Band | 5p13.2 | End | 35,879,603 bp |

Gene location (Mouse)
| Chr. | Chromosome 15 (mouse) |
| Band | 15 A1|15 4.16 cM | Start | 9,505,874 bp |
| Band | 15 A1|15 4.16 cM | End | 9,530,262 bp |
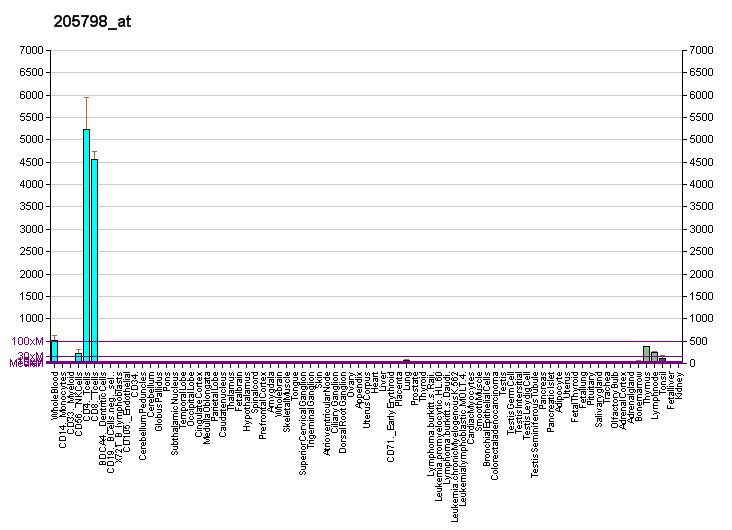
RNA expression pattern
| Bgee | Human / Mouse (ortholog); Top expressed in: right lung; granulocyte; lymph node; lower lobe of lung; epithelium of nasopharynx; appendix; blood; thymus; upper lobe of left lung; gallbladder / Top expressed in: blood; mesenteric lymph nodes; spleen; thymus; tibiofemoral joint; subcutaneous adipose tissue; bone marrow; Paneth cell; pharynx; lumbar subsegment of spinal cord; More reference expression data |
| BioGPS | More reference expression data |
Gene ontology
| Molecular function | antigen binding; interleukin-7 receptor activity; protein binding; cytokine receptor activity |
| Cellular component | integral component of membrane; membrane; plasma membrane; extracellular region; external side of plasma membrane; clathrin-coated vesicle membrane |
| Biological process | regulation of cell size; regulation of DNA recombination; positive regulation of T cell differentiation in thymus; homeostasis of number of cells; negative regulation of T cell mediated cytotoxicity; cell surface receptor signaling pathway; B cell proliferation; T cell differentiation; positive regulation of gene expression; immune response; cell morphogenesis; lymph node development; immunoglobulin production; signal transduction; interleukin-7-mediated signaling pathway; positive regulation of cell population proliferation; positive regulation of receptor signaling pathway via STAT; membrane organization; negative regulation of T cell apoptotic process |
Sources:Amigo / QuickGO
Orthologs
| Databases | NCBI: entry; OMA: entry |
| Species | Human | Mouse |
| Entrez | 3575 | 16197 |
| Ensembl | ENSG00000168685 | ENSMUSG00000003882 |
| UniProt | P16871 | P16872 |
| RefSeq (mRNA) | NM_002185 | NM_008372; NM_001355680 |
| RefSeq (protein) | NP_002176 | NP_032398; NP_001342609 |
| Location (UCSC) | Chr 5: 35.85 – 35.88 Mb | Chr 15: 9.51 – 9.53 Mb |
| PubMed search |
- Wikidata
| View/Edit Human | View/Edit Mouse |

Interleukin-7 receptor subunit alpha (IL7R-α) also known as CD127 (Cluster of Differentiation 127) is a protein that in humans is encoded by the IL7R gene.

IL7R-α is a type I cytokine receptor and is a subunit of the functional interleukin-7 receptor and thymic stromal lymphopoietin (TSLP) receptors.
