= STAT5B =

Protein-coding gene in the species Homo sapiens

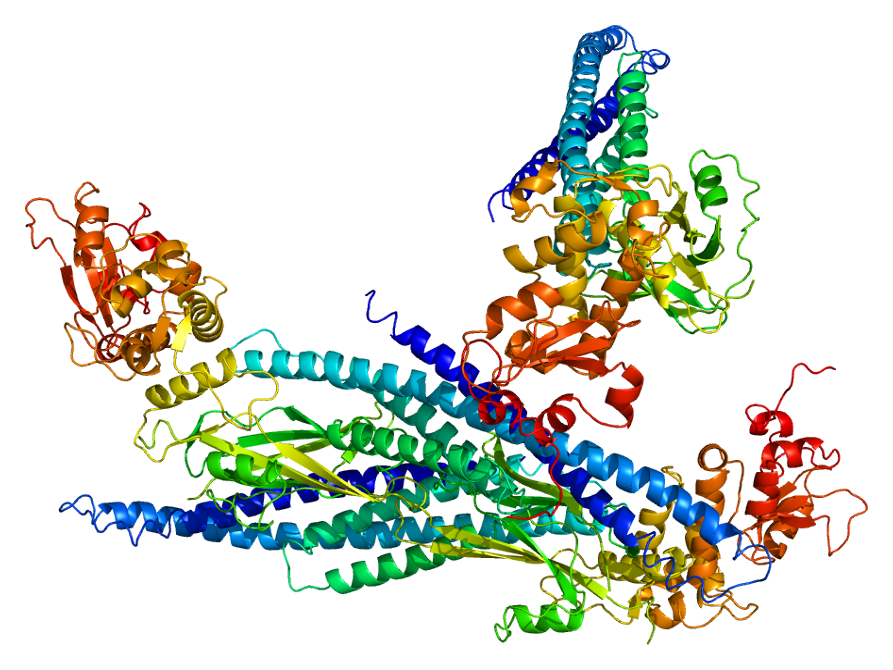

Identifiers
- Aliases: STAT5B, STAT5, signal transducer and activator of transcription 5B, GHISID2
- External IDs: OMIM: 604260; MGI: 103035; GeneCards: STAT5B

Gene location (Human)
Chr.	Chromosome 17 (human)
Band	17q21.2	Start	42,199,177 bp
Band	17q21.2	End	42,276,707 bp

Gene location (Mouse)
Chr.	Chromosome 11 (mouse)
Band	11 D|11 63.63 cM	Start	100,671,557 bp
Band	11 D|11 63.63 cM	End	100,741,550 bp
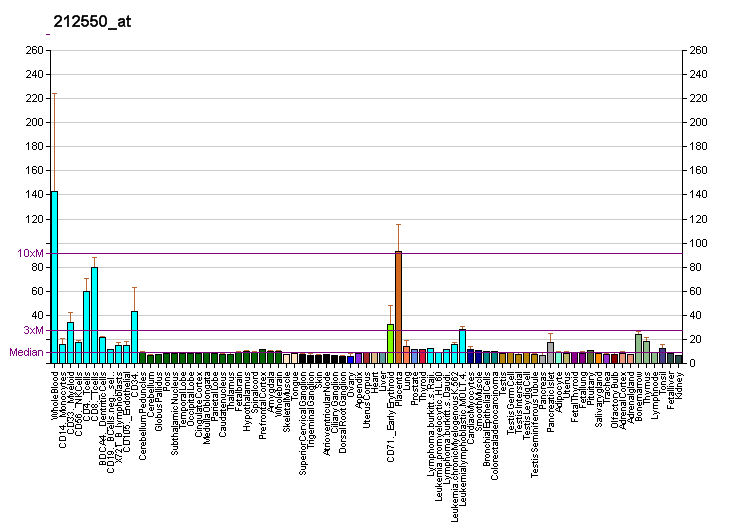

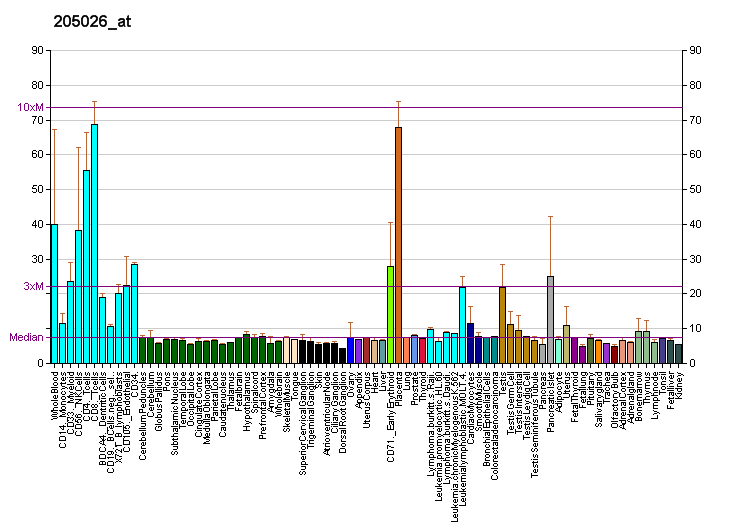

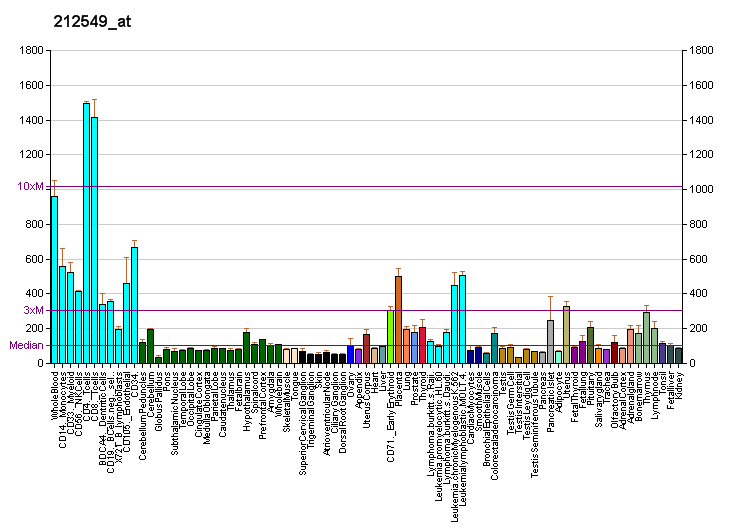
RNA expression pattern
Bgee	Human / Mouse (ortholog); Top expressed in: blood; body of uterus; left uterine tube; right ovary; left ovary; paraflocculus of cerebellum; beta cell; frontal pole; granulocyte; middle frontal gyrus / Top expressed in: medial head of gastrocnemius muscle; triceps brachii muscle; ankle; muscle of thigh; temporal muscle; vastus lateralis muscle; granulocyte; thymus; sternocleidomastoid muscle; seminal vesicula; More reference expression data
BioGPS	More reference expression data
Gene ontology
Molecular function	signal transducer activity; glucocorticoid receptor binding; protein dimerization activity; chromatin binding; DNA-binding transcription factor activity; DNA binding; DNA-binding transcription activator activity, RNA polymerase II-specific; protein binding; protein tyrosine kinase activity; RNA polymerase II cis-regulatory region sequence-specific DNA binding; DNA-binding transcription factor activity, RNA polymerase II-specific
Cellular component	nucleoplasm; cytoplasm; nucleus; cytosol
Biological process	positive regulation of natural killer cell differentiation; positive regulation of natural killer cell mediated cytotoxicity; regulation of steroid metabolic process; creatinine metabolic process; T cell differentiation in thymus; female pregnancy; cellular response to hormone stimulus; positive regulation of activated T cell proliferation; progesterone metabolic process; receptor signaling pathway via JAK-STAT; negative regulation of apoptotic process; Peyer's patch development; transcription, DNA-templated; signal transduction; cellular response to growth factor stimulus; natural killer cell differentiation; response to interleukin-4; sex differentiation; valine metabolic process; positive regulation of B cell differentiation; T cell homeostasis; creatine metabolic process; cellular response to epidermal growth factor stimulus; response to estradiol; positive regulation of inflammatory response; regulation of transcription by RNA polymerase II; mast cell migration; positive regulation of mitotic cell cycle; lipid storage; development of secondary female sexual characteristics; fatty acid metabolic process; taurine metabolic process; succinate metabolic process; positive regulation of gamma-delta T cell differentiation; positive regulation of lymphocyte differentiation; regulation of multicellular organism growth; citrate metabolic process; positive regulation of cell population proliferation; oxaloacetate metabolic process; regulation of epithelial cell differentiation; positive regulation of natural killer cell proliferation; development of secondary male sexual characteristics; positive regulation of multicellular organism growth; regulation of transcription, DNA-templated; allantoin metabolic process; positive regulation of transcription by RNA polymerase II; transcription by RNA polymerase II; luteinization; isoleucine metabolic process; negative regulation of erythrocyte differentiation; lactation; response to interleukin-15; regulation of cell adhesion; 2-oxoglutarate metabolic process; response to interleukin-2; growth hormone receptor signaling pathway via JAK-STAT; positive regulation of erythrocyte differentiation; peptidyl-tyrosine phosphorylation; interleukin-7-mediated signaling pathway; interleukin-15-mediated signaling pathway; cytokine-mediated signaling pathway; interleukin-2-mediated signaling pathway; interleukin-9-mediated signaling pathway; defense response; regulation of cell population proliferation; response to peptide hormone
Sources:Amigo / QuickGO
Orthologs
Databases	NCBI: entry; OMA: entry
Species	Human	Mouse
Entrez	6777	20851
Ensembl	ENSG00000173757	ENSMUSG00000020919
UniProt	P51692	P42232
RefSeq (mRNA)	NM_012448	NM_001113563; NM_011489; NM_001362682
RefSeq (protein)	NP_036580	NP_001107035; NP_035619; NP_001349611
Location (UCSC)	Chr 17: 42.2 – 42.28 Mb	Chr 11: 100.67 – 100.74 Mb
PubMed search
- Wikidata
View/Edit Human	View/Edit Mouse

Signal transducer and activator of transcription 5B is a protein that in humans is encoded by the STAT5B gene. STAT5B orthologs have been identified in most placentals for which complete genome data are available.

== Function ==
The protein encoded by this gene is a member of the STAT family of transcription factors. In response to cytokines and growth factors, STAT family members are phosphorylated by the receptor associated kinases, and then form homo- or heterodimers that translocate to the cell nucleus where they act as transcription activators. This protein mediates the signal transduction triggered by various cell ligands, such as IL2, IL4, CSF1, and different growth hormones. It has been shown to be involved in diverse biological processes, such as TCR signaling, apoptosis, adult mammary gland development, and sexual dimorphism of liver gene expression. This gene was found to fuse to retinoic acid receptor-alpha (RARA) gene in a small subset of acute promyelocytic leukemias (APML). The dysregulation of the signaling pathways mediated by this protein may be the cause of the APML.

== Interactions ==
STAT5B has been shown to interact with:

- Glucocorticoid receptor,
- Janus kinase 1,
- Janus kinase 2, and
- PTPN11.

== See also ==
- STAT5
