= PIAS3 =

Protein-coding gene in humans

Identifiers
- Aliases: PIAS3, ZMIZ5, protein inhibitor of activated STAT 3
- External IDs: OMIM: 605987; MGI: 1913126; GeneCards: PIAS3
Available structures
| PDB | Ortholog search: PDBe RCSB |
| PDB | List of PDB id codes 4MVT |

Gene location (Human)
| Chr. | Chromosome 1 (human) |
| Band | 1q21.1 | Start | 145,848,522 bp |
| Band | 1q21.1 | End | 145,859,836 bp |

Gene location (Mouse)
| Chr. | Chromosome 3 (mouse) |
| Band | 3|3 F2.1 | Start | 96,603,700 bp |
| Band | 3|3 F2.1 | End | 96,613,386 bp |
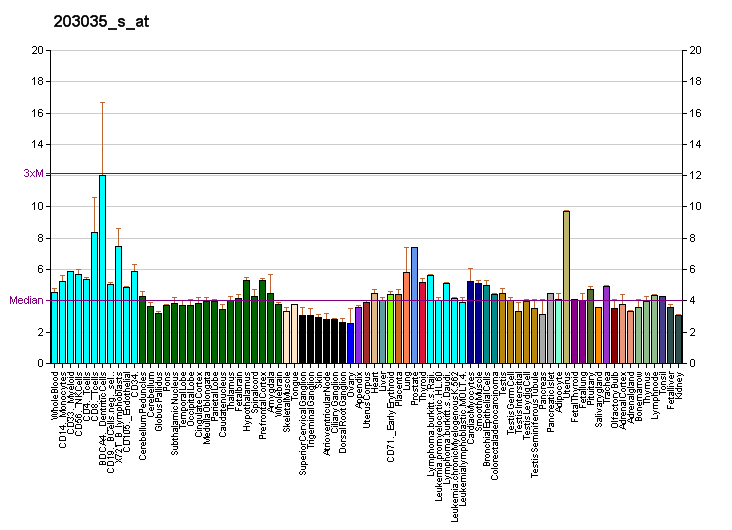
RNA expression pattern
| Bgee | Human / Mouse (ortholog); Top expressed in: right uterine tube; canal of the cervix; Descending thoracic aorta; right coronary artery; ectocervix; body of uterus; ascending aorta; left uterine tube; gastric mucosa; popliteal artery / Top expressed in: neural layer of retina; granulocyte; ankle joint; lip; otic vesicle; molar; lens; genital tubercle; yolk sac; ventricular zone; More reference expression data |
| BioGPS | More reference expression data |
Gene ontology
| Molecular function | protein N-terminus binding; zinc ion binding; metal ion binding; potassium channel regulator activity; protein C-terminus binding; protein binding; enzyme binding; SUMO transferase activity; transferase activity |
| Cellular component | cytoplasm; nuclear speck; synapse; nucleoplasm; dendrite; nucleus |
| Biological process | negative regulation of protein sumoylation; regulation of transcription, DNA-templated; positive regulation of protein sumoylation; protein sumoylation; transcription, DNA-templated; positive regulation of gene expression; response to hormone; positive regulation of membrane potential; negative regulation of transcription by RNA polymerase II; negative regulation of gene expression; negative regulation of osteoclast differentiation; negative regulation of transcription, DNA-templated; TNFSF11-mediated signaling pathway |
Sources:Amigo / QuickGO
Orthologs
| Databases | NCBI: entry; OMA: entry |
| Species | Human | Mouse |
| Entrez | 10401 | 229615 |
| Ensembl | ENSG00000131788 | ENSMUSG00000028101 |
| UniProt | Q9Y6X2 | O54714 |
| RefSeq (mRNA) | NM_006099 | NM_001165949; NM_018812; NM_146135 |
| RefSeq (protein) | NP_006090 | NP_001159421; NP_061282; NP_666247 |
| Location (UCSC) | Chr 1: 145.85 – 145.86 Mb | Chr 3: 96.6 – 96.61 Mb |
| PubMed search |
- Wikidata
| View/Edit Human | View/Edit Mouse |

E3 SUMO-protein ligase PIAS3 is an enzyme that in humans is encoded by the PIAS3 gene.

== Discovery ==
IAS proteins were originally identified in studies that were aimed to decipher the Janus Kinase (JAK)/STAT signaling pathway. Originally, PIAS3 was found to interact specifically with phosphorylated STAT3 in Interleukin -6 (IL-6) activated murine myeloblast M1 cells. This interaction is mediated via PIAS3 binding to the STAT3 DNA binding domain. Hence, STAT3 transcriptional activity is inhibited by the physical prevention of its binding to target genes. Subsequently, PIAS3 was also found to be a regulator protein of other key transcription factors, including MITF, NFκB, SMAD and estrogen receptor.

== PIAS family ==
The mammalian PIAS family consists of four members: PIAS1, PIAS2, PIAS3 (this gene) and PIAS4. In Drosophila, a single PIAS homologue named dPIAS/Zimp has been identified. In yeast, two PIAS-related proteins were identified namely SIZ1 and SIZ2. The PIAS family contains more than 60 proteins, most of them transcription factors that can be either positively or negatively regulated through multiple mechanisms.

== Structure ==
The SAF-A/B, Acinus and PIAS (SAP) domain is located at the N-terminal of PIAS proteins. This evolutionarily conserved domain is found in proteins ranging from yeast to human and is shared by other chromatin-binding proteins, such as scaffold attachment factor A and B. The SAP domain can recognize and bind to AT-rich DNA sequences present in scaffold-attachment regions/matrix-attachment regions. These elements are frequently found near gene enhancers and interact with nuclear matrix proteins to provide a unique nuclear microenvironment for transcriptional regulation. An LXXLL signature motif is present within the SAP domain of all PIAS proteins. This signature motif has been shown to mediate interactions between nuclear receptors and their co-regulators. It is also essential for the binding of PIAS3 to androgen receptor. The LXXLL motif represents the minimal requirement for the interaction with the NFκB p65 subunit and for the inhibition of NFκB transcriptional activity. It was previously described that the LXXLL motif is also responsible for the retention of PIAS3 in the nucleus.

The Pro-Ile-Asn-Ile-Thr (PINIT) motif represents a highly conserved region of PIAS proteins, which was shown to be involved in the nuclear retention of PIAS3. Within the PINIT domain, the PIAS382-132 region was isolated and characterized as an inhibitory domain that binds and inhibits both the MITF and STAT3 transcription factors. The RING-finger-like zinc-binding domain (RLD) is one of the most conserved domains of the PIAS family and has been shown to be important for PIAS3 activity as a SUMO-E3 ligase. The RLD domain is also involved in the positive regulation of SMAD3 by PIAS3.

== Function ==
PIAS3 protein also functions as a SUMO (small ubiquitin-like modifier)-E3 ligase which catalyzes the covalent attachment of a SUMO protein to specific target substrates. It directly binds to several transcription factors and either blocks or enhances their activity. Alternatively spliced transcript variants of this gene have been identified, but the full-length nature of some of these variants has not been determined.

== Interactions ==
PIAS3 has been shown to interact with:

- GFI1,
- HMGA2
- MITF,
- SMAD2,
- SMAD3, and
- RELA.

== Clinical significance ==
- TAR syndrome
- 1q21.1 deletion syndrome
- 1q21.1 duplication syndrome
