= Protein inhibitor of activated STAT =

PIAS and the JAK-STAT pathway. Upon stimulation by IL-6, PIAS3 can inhibit transcription activation by activated STAT3.

Protein inhibitor of activated STAT (PIAS), also known as E3 SUMO-protein ligase PIAS, is a protein that regulates transcription in mammals. PIAS proteins act as transcriptional co-regulators with at least 60 different proteins in order to either activate or repress transcription. The transcription factors STAT, NF-κB, p73, and p53 are among the many proteins that PIAS interacts with.

The seven proteins that belong to the mammalian PIAS family are encoded by four genes: PIAS1, PIAS2 (PIASx), PIAS3, and PIAS4 (PIASy). Apart from PIAS1, each gene encodes two protein isoforms. Homologues of PIAS proteins have been found in other eukaryotes, including Zimp/dPIAS in Drosophila melanogaster and zfPIAS4a in zebrafish. SIZ1 and SIZ2 were two homologues identified in yeast.

PIAS proteins contain each conserved domain and motif of the PIAS protein family, with a few exceptions. The known functions of these domains and motifs are similar among all PIAS protein family members. These functions include acting as E3 SUMO-protein ligases during SUMOylation, which is an important process in transcriptional regulation. Presently, less is known about the higher order structure of PIAS proteins. The three-dimensional protein structures of PIAS2, PIAS3, and SIZ1 have only recently been solved.

PIAS proteins have potential applications in cancer treatment and prevention. They may also play an important role in regulating immune system responses.

== Discovery ==
The discovery of PIAS3 was first published in 1997. The discovery was made while the JAK-STAT pathway was being studied. The discovery of other PIAS proteins, including PIAS1, PIASxα, PIASxβ, and PIASy, was published the following year. The interaction between STATs and PIASs was characterized by the yeast two-hybrid assay. PIAS proteins were named based on their ability to inhibit STAT. For example, PIAS1 inhibited STAT1, and PIAS3 inhibited STAT3.

When it was discovered that PIAS proteins did far more than simply inhibit STATs, it was proposed that the PIAS acronym should stand for Pleiotropic Interactors Associated with SUMO based on their association with SUMO proteins. Additionally, E3 SUMO-protein ligase PIAS is an alternative name for PIAS proteins.

The discovery of PIAS3L, an isoform of PIAS3, was published in 2003. In addition, the discovery of PIASyE6- was published in 2004. It is an isoform of PIASy that doesn't contain exon 6.

== Types of PIAS proteins ==
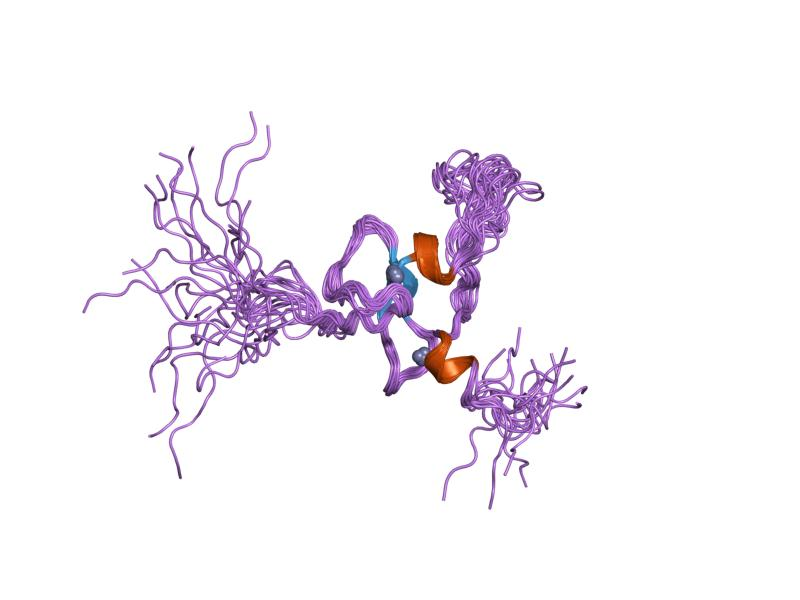
PHD zinc finger domain of SIZ1. SIZ1 is a PIAS protein homologue found in yeast.

The table below lists the seven known proteins that belong to the mammalian PIAS protein family. Due to alternative splicing, some PIAS protein-encoding genes encode multiple protein products called isoforms. PIAS1 is the only gene of this family that does not encode any isoforms.

Gene	Encoded Protein(s)
PIAS1	PIAS1
PIAS2 (PIASx)	PIASxα, PIASxβ
PIAS3	PIAS3, PIAS3L (also known as PIAS3β)
PIAS4 (PIASy)	PIASy, PIASyE6-

=== Homologues ===
Homologues of PIAS proteins have been found in other eukaryotes, and several are listed below:

- Zimp/dPIAS in Drosophila melanogaster
- zfPIAS4a in zebrafish
- SIZ1 and SIZ2 in yeast

== Function ==
PIAS proteins contribute to the control of gene expression, and may be considered transcriptional co-regulators. While PIAS proteins interact with at least 60 different proteins involved in transcription, they are known to act as E3 SUMO-protein ligases. In essence, the RING-finger-like zinc-binding domain of the PIAS protein assists in the attachment of a SUMO protein to the target transcription factor. Attachment of a SUMO protein to the target allows for protein–protein interaction between PIAS and the transcription factor. This interaction can either upregulate or downregulate transcription. For example, the activity of transcription factor p73 was repressed after it was SUMOylated by PIAS1. One function of PIAS proteins is to relocate transcriptional regulators to different compartments within the nucleus of the cell.

PIAS proteins also play a key role in double-stranded break DNA repair. Exposure to UV light, chemicals, and ionizing radiation can cause DNA damage, and the most detrimental type of DNA damage is a double-stranded break. PIAS1, PIAS3, and PIAS4 have been shown to recruit proteins to the site of the damage and promote repair.

Additionally, PIAS proteins are important transcriptional co-regulators of the JAK/STAT signaling pathway. PIAS protein's interaction with STAT signaling requires tyrosine phosphorylation of STAT proteins. Additionally, PIAS1 binds preferentially to un-methylated STAT1. Although the exact mechanism isn't clear, PIAS1 and PIASy both inhibit STAT1 signaling. PIAS3 was found to specifically inhibit STAT3 signaling after stimulation by the cytokine IL-6. Also, it is known that PIAS1 can inhibit NF-κB activity upon stimulation by the cytokine TNF and the LPS endotoxin.

== Structure ==
The domains (SAP, RLD, AD, S/T) and motifs (PINIT, SIM) found in most protein inhibitors of activated STAT (PIAS)

The three-dimensional protein structures of PIAS2, PIAS3, and PIAS-like protein SIZ1 were recently solved using X-ray crystallography. The structures of PIAS2 and PIAS3 were listed in the Structural Genomics Consortium in 2012 and 2013, respectively, by A. Dong et al. Details of the SIZ1 structure were published by Ali A. Yunus and Christopher D. Lima in 2009.

Four PIAS domains and two PIAS motifs have been identified. They include the N-terminal scaffold attachment factor-A/B, acinus and PIAS (SAP) domain, the Pro-Ile-Asn-Ile-Thr (PINIT) motif, the RING-finger-like zinc-binding domain (RLD), the highly acidic domain (AD), the SUMO-interacting motif (SIM), and the serine/threonine-rich C-terminal region (S/T).

PIAS protein regions
Name	Abbreviation	Function(s)
N-terminal scaffold attachment factor-A/B, acinus and PIAS domain	SAP	Binds to DNA matrix-attachment regions, proteins (i.e.: p53, nuclear receptors)
Pro-Ile-Asn-Ile-Thr motif	PINIT	nuclear retention
RING-finger-like zinc-binding domain	RLD	SUMOylation; interaction with other proteins
Highly acidic domain	AD	unknown
SUMO-interacting motif	SIM	recognition and interaction with SUMO proteins
Serine/threonine-rich C-terminal region	S/T	unknown

=== SAP ===
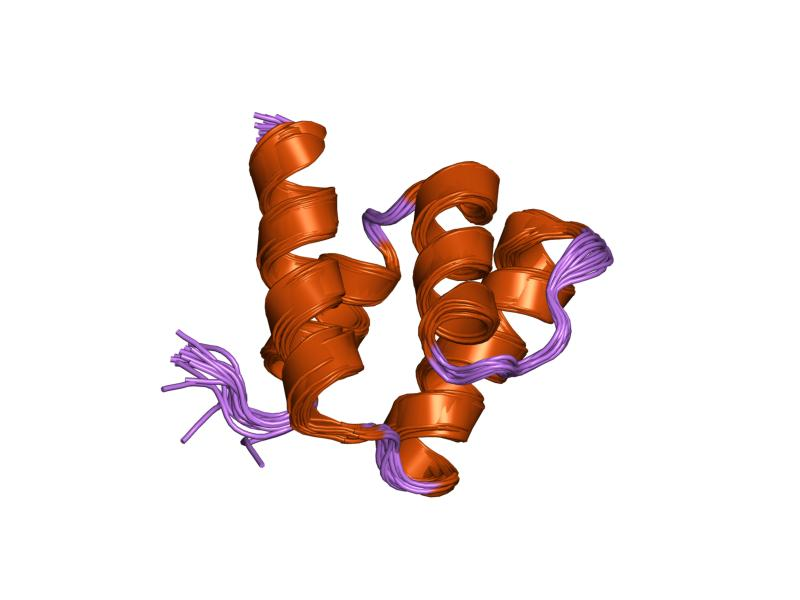
p53 binding domain of PIAS-1.

The N-terminal scaffold attachment factor-A/B, acinus and PIAS (SAP) domain is found in all PIAS proteins. It is composed of four alpha helices. It binds to areas of chromatin that are rich in adenine (A) and thymine (T). These A/T rich regions are known as matrix-attachment regions. Once bound, the matrix-attachment regions anchor loops of chromatin to the nuclear matrix. The nuclear matrix is a structure within the nucleus where it is thought that transcription regulation takes place. SAP also binds to p53.

Each SAP domain contains an LXXLL amino acid motif. L = leucine, and X = any amino acid. This motif is used to bind to nuclear receptors. Nuclear receptors are transcription factors that regulate transcription upon ligand binding.

=== PINIT ===
The Pro-Ile-Asn-Ile-Thr (PINIT) motif was discovered in PIAS3L, an isoform of PIAS3. PIAS proteins tend to go back and forth between the nucleus and cytosol as they carry out their activities. PINIT is needed to localize PIAS3 and PIAS3L to the nucleus.

PIASy has a slight difference in its PINIT motif: leucine is in place of the second isoleucine (PINLT). Furthermore, the PINIT motif is not found in PIASy isoform PIASyE6-. This isoform, lacking exon 6, is still retained in the nucleus despite lacking the PINIT motif. The reason for this is unknown.

=== RLD ===
The RING-finger-like zinc-binding domain is present in all PIAS proteins. RLD is essential for PIAS proteins to function as E3 SUMO-protein ligases. It is also needed for successful interaction with other proteins. Its three dimensional structure is thought to be similar to typical RING finger domains. It contains one histidine residue and five cysteine residues

=== AD and SIM ===
The highly acidic domain (AD), present in all PIAS proteins, contains a SUMO-interacting motif (SIM). The SIM motif may be needed for PIAS proteins to accurately recognize and interact with other SUMO proteins. However, it is not needed for E3 SUMO-protein ligase activity to occur. The function of the highly acidic domain is unknown.

=== S/T ===
The Serine/threonine-rich C-terminal (S/T) region is not found in all PIAS proteins. PIASy and PIASyE6- are the only members of the PIAS protein family that lack this region. Furthermore, the length of this region varies among PIAS protein isoforms. The function of the S/T region is unknown.

Structural differences between PIAS proteins
Type	Amino acid length	Protein regions
PIAS1	651	SAP, PINIT, RLD, AD, SIM, S/T
PIASxα	572	SAP, PINIT, RLD, AD, SIM, S/T
PIASxβ	621	SAP, PINIT, RLD, AD, SIM, S/T
PIAS3	593	SAP, PINIT, RLD, AD, SIM, S/T
PIAS3L	628	SAP, PINIT, RLD, AD, SIM, S/T
PIASy	510	SAP, PINIT, RLD, AD
PIASyE6-	467	SAP, RLD, AD

== Potential applications ==
Defects in the DNA repair system lead to a predisposition for developing cancer. At least some of the PIAS proteins are implicated in DNA repair, and specifically in enhancing repair of double-stranded breaks. In cell culture, overexpression of PIAS3 demonstrated an increased resistance of HeLa cells to ionizing radiation. This indicates a significant role for PIAS3 in DNA repair. Additionally, overexpression of PIAS3 inhibited human lung cancer cell growth in vitro and rendered cancer cells up to twelve times more sensitive to chemotherapeutic drugs. While inhibition of PIAS by siRNAs led cancer cells to accelerate cell proliferation and demonstrate higher levels of resistance to chemotherapy drugs. In a study of human brain tissue samples from glioblastoma multiforme patients, PIAS3 expression was found to be reduced compared to the control brain tissue. Inhibition of PIAS3 resulted in increased glioblastoma propagation, while PIAS3 overexpression inhibited STAT-3 signaling and cell proliferation . Furthermore, patients with higher levels of BRCA1, PIAS1, and PIAS4 survived for a longer period of time in a retrospective study of advanced gastric cancer patients.

Continuous activation of the JAK-STAT pathway can cause cancer in humans as well as less complex organisms such as Drosophila. Given the preliminary evidence and their effects on important signaling pathways involved in cancer, PIAS proteins may be interesting targets for the development of treatments for cancers or as sensitizers for chemotherapeutic drugs and radiation in BRCA-deficient cancers.

In addition to its importance in various cancers, the JAK-STAT signaling pathway plays an important part in the human immune response and in particular with regards to adaptive immunity. Clinical proof of concept for the use of JAK inhibitors for treatment of autoimmune and inflammatory disease has been demonstrated by Pfizer's tofacitinib, a JAK inhibitor recently approved in the US for the treatment of rheumatoid arthritis. Additionally, tofacitinib is currently being studied for the treatment of ankylosing spondylitis, psoriatic arthritis, psoriasis, atopic dermatitis, and inflammatory bowel disease.

Furthermore, STAT1 and STAT2 are essential factors in the cellular antiviral and adaptive immune defenses. PIAS proteins and other regulators are necessary for homeostasis and for fine tuning the immune response. PIAS proteins regulate STAT transcription through several mechanisms, and genetic studies in rodents have shown that PIAS1 plays an important physiological role in STAT1 regulation. Many of the 60 proteins that PIAS protein family is believed to interact with are immune regulatory factors.
