= Suppressor of cytokine signalling =

Family of genes

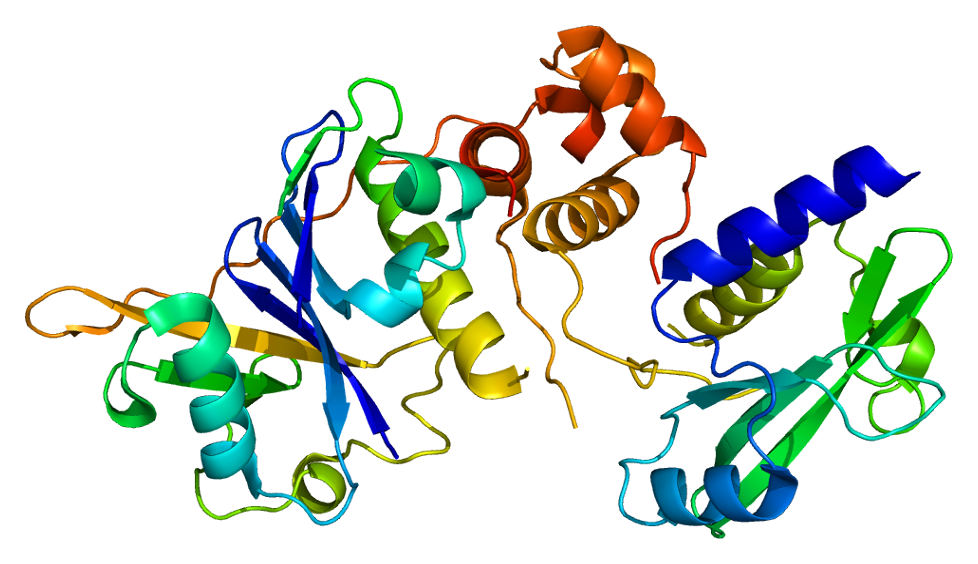
Suppressor of Cytokine Signaling 2

SOCS (suppressor of cytokine signaling proteins) refers to a family of genes involved in inhibiting the JAK-STAT signaling pathway.

== Genes ==
- CISH
- SOCS1
- SOCS2
- SOCS3
- SOCS4
- SOCS5
- SOCS6
- SOCS7

== Structure ==
All SOCS have certain structures in common. This includes a varying N-terminal domain involved in protein-protein interactions, a central SH2 domain, which can bind to molecules that have been phosphorylated by tyrosine kinases, and a SOCS box located at the C-terminal that enables recruitment of E3 ligases and ubiquitin signaling molecules.

== Discovery ==
The first protein to be classified as a suppressor of cytokine signaling, CIS (cytokine-inducible SH2), was discovered in 1995, when it was found to have a unique ability to regulate cytokine signal transduction.

== Function ==
SOCS are negative regulators of the JAK-STAT signaling pathway. SOCS have also been implicated in the regulation of cytokines, growth factors, and tumor suppression.

== Role in Disease ==
It has been suggested that SOCS can help prevent cytokine-mediated apoptosis in diabetes through negative regulation of pro-inflammatory cytokines secreted by immune cells, such as IFNγ, TNFα and IL-15. Improper functioning of one specific SOCS, SOCS3 may lead to type 2 diabetes, as it has been found that SOCS3 plays an important role in proper leptin signaling.
