= Lymphoid enhancer-binding factor 1 =

Protein-coding gene in the species Homo sapiens

LEF1
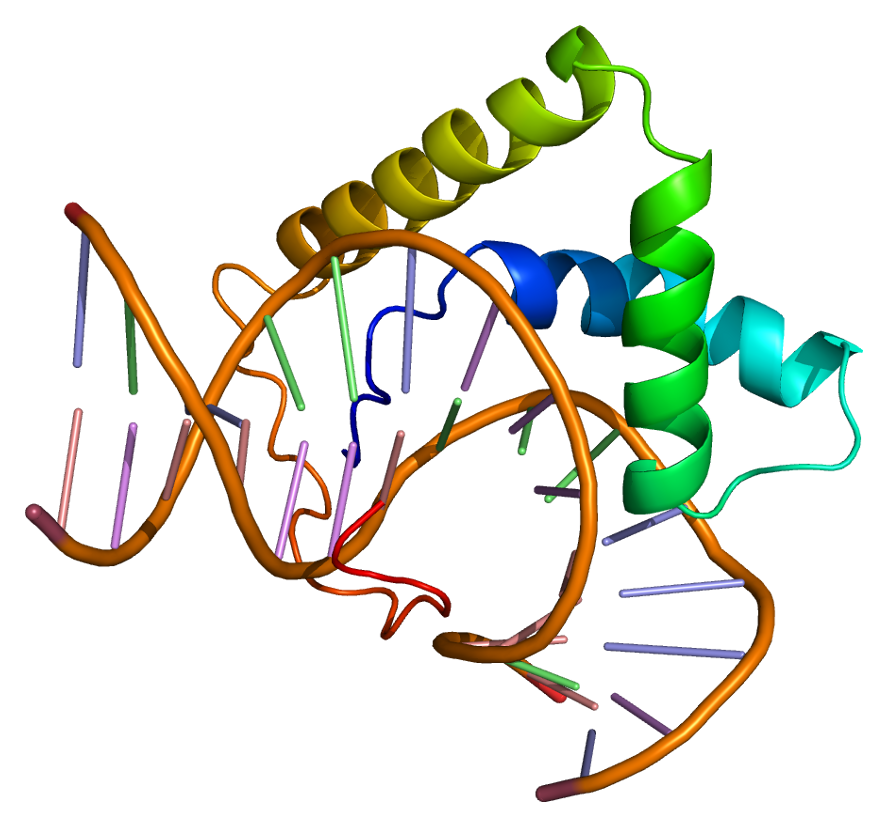

Identifiers
- Aliases: LEF1, LEF-1, TCF10, TCF1ALPHA, TCF7L3, lymphoid enhancer binding factor 1
- External IDs: MGI: 96770; GeneCards: LEF1
Available structures
PDB	Ortholog search: PDBe RCSB
PDB	List of PDB id codes 2LEF, 3OUW, 3OUX

Gene location (Human)
Chr.	Chromosome 4 (human)
Band	4q25	Start	108,047,545 bp
Band	4q25	End	108,168,956 bp

Gene location (Mouse)
Chr.	Chromosome 3 (mouse)
Band	3 G3|3 60.78 cM	Start	130,904,120 bp
Band	3 G3|3 60.78 cM	End	131,018,005 bp
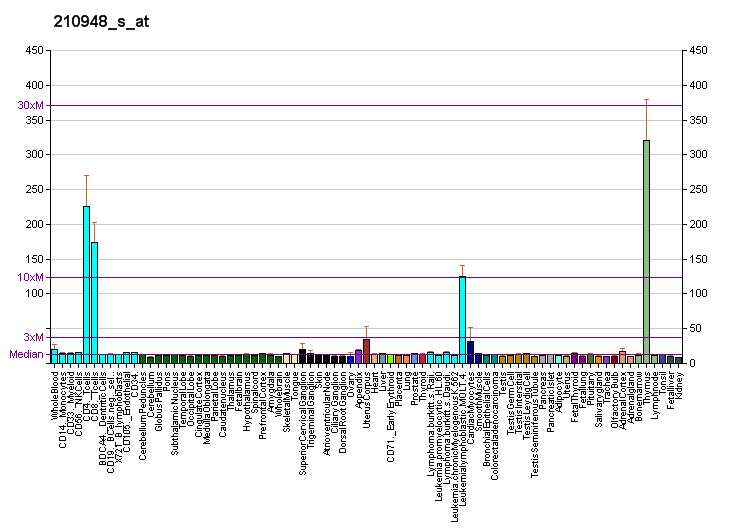

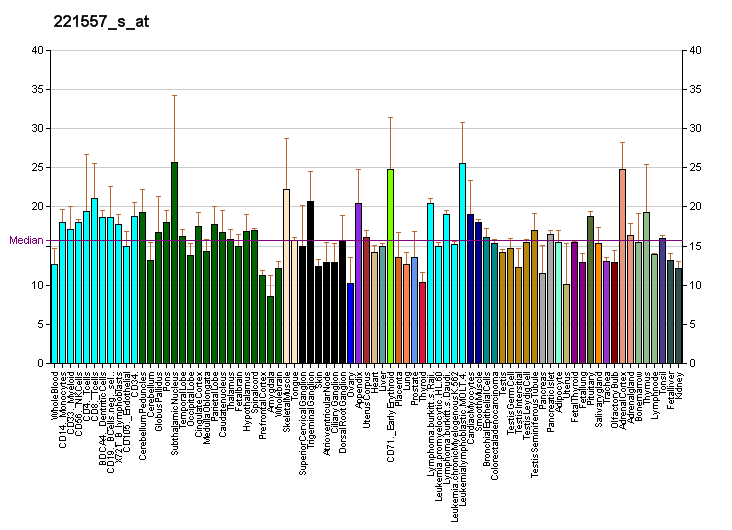

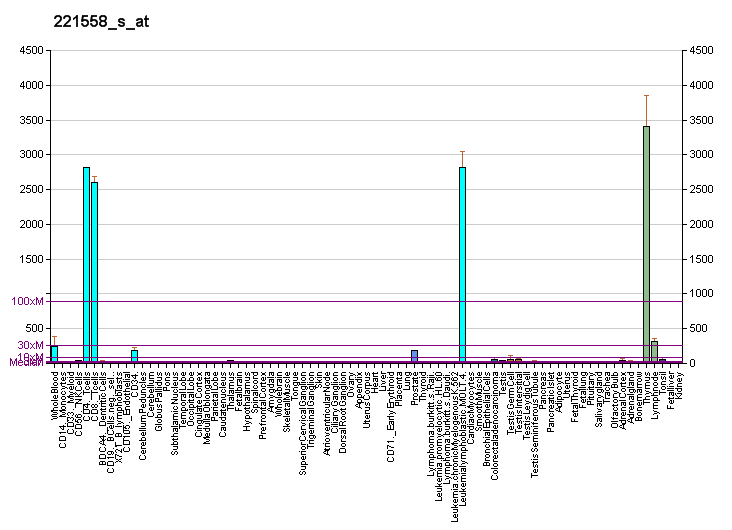
RNA expression pattern
Bgee	Human / Mouse (ortholog); Top expressed in: thymus; lymph node; tibia; oocyte; lateral nuclear group of thalamus; secondary oocyte; blood; appendix; buccal mucosa cell; granulocyte / Top expressed in: tail of embryo; genital tubercle; thymus; lamina propria of urethra; mesenteric lymph nodes; maxillary prominence; tooth germ; blood; zygote; hair follicle; More reference expression data
BioGPS	More reference expression data
Gene ontology
Molecular function	DNA-binding transcription factor activity; DNA-binding transcription activator activity, RNA polymerase II-specific; histone deacetylase binding; armadillo repeat domain binding; estrogen receptor binding; RNA polymerase II transcription regulatory region sequence-specific DNA binding; transcription factor binding; estrogen receptor activity; gamma-catenin binding; histone binding; C2H2 zinc finger domain binding; chromatin binding; cysteine-type endopeptidase inhibitor activity involved in apoptotic process; protein binding; DNA binding, bending; DNA binding; sequence-specific DNA binding; transcription factor activity, RNA polymerase II distal enhancer sequence-specific binding; beta-catenin binding; RNA polymerase II cis-regulatory region sequence-specific DNA binding; DNA-binding transcription factor activity, RNA polymerase II-specific
Cellular component	cytoplasm; nucleus; transcription regulator complex; beta-catenin-TCF complex; nucleoplasm; protein-DNA complex
Biological process	somitogenesis; tongue development; paraxial mesoderm formation; regulation of transcription by RNA polymerase II; negative regulation of DNA binding; T cell receptor V(D)J recombination; transcription by RNA polymerase II; cellular response to cytokine stimulus; mammary gland development; negative regulation of interleukin-13 production; odontogenesis of dentin-containing tooth; apoptotic process involved in blood vessel morphogenesis; cell chemotaxis; negative regulation of canonical Wnt signaling pathway; face morphogenesis; neutrophil differentiation; negative regulation of interleukin-5 production; regulation of transcription, DNA-templated; dentate gyrus development; apoptotic process involved in morphogenesis; transcription, DNA-templated; positive regulation of transcription, DNA-templated; positive regulation of cell growth; regulation of Wnt signaling pathway; embryonic limb morphogenesis; hypothalamus development; branching involved in blood vessel morphogenesis; trachea gland development; regulation of striated muscle tissue development; positive regulation of cell-cell adhesion; forebrain neuroblast division; eye pigmentation; negative regulation of apoptotic process; sprouting angiogenesis; negative regulation of transcription by RNA polymerase II; positive regulation of epithelial to mesenchymal transition; BMP signaling pathway; positive regulation of cell cycle process; osteoblast differentiation; histone H3 acetylation; formation of radial glial scaffolds; positive regulation of granulocyte differentiation; alpha-beta T cell differentiation; canonical Wnt signaling pathway; negative regulation of transcription, DNA-templated; sensory perception of taste; cellular response to interleukin-4; negative regulation of cysteine-type endopeptidase activity involved in apoptotic process; cell development; negative regulation of cell-cell adhesion; negative regulation of interleukin-4 production; negative regulation of striated muscle tissue development; positive regulation of cell migration; Wnt signaling pathway; T-helper 1 cell differentiation; positive regulation of cell proliferation in bone marrow; anatomical structure regression; chorio-allantoic fusion; negative regulation of apoptotic process in bone marrow cell; B cell proliferation; positive regulation of gene expression; vasculature development; forebrain radial glial cell differentiation; neural crest cell migration; positive regulation of cell population proliferation; forebrain neuron differentiation; histone H4 acetylation; hippocampus development; positive regulation of transcription by RNA polymerase II; Wnt signaling pathway, calcium modulating pathway; steroid hormone mediated signaling pathway; odontoblast differentiation; beta-catenin-TCF complex assembly; epithelial to mesenchymal transition; regulation of cell-cell adhesion; secondary palate development
Sources:Amigo / QuickGO
Orthologs
Databases	NCBI: entry; OMA: entry
Species	Human	Mouse
Entrez	51176	16842
Ensembl	ENSG00000138795	ENSMUSG00000027985
UniProt	Q9UJU2; Q659G9	P27782
RefSeq (mRNA)	NM_001130713; NM_001130714; NM_001166119; NM_016269	NM_001276402; NM_001276403; NM_010703; NM_001379059; NM_001379060 NM_001379061; NM_001379062
RefSeq (protein)	NP_001124185; NP_001124186; NP_001159591; NP_057353; NP_057353.1	NP_001263331; NP_001263332; NP_034833; NP_001365988; NP_001365989 NP_001365990; NP_001365991
Location (UCSC)	Chr 4: 108.05 – 108.17 Mb	Chr 3: 130.9 – 131.02 Mb
PubMed search
- Wikidata
View/Edit Human	View/Edit Mouse

Lymphoid enhancer-binding factor 1 (LEF1) is a protein that in humans is encoded by the LEF1 gene. It is a member of T cell factor/lymphoid enhancer factor (TCF/LEF) family.

== Function ==
Lymphoid enhancer-binding factor-1 (LEF1) is a 48-kD nuclear protein that is expressed in pre-B and T cells. It binds to a functionally important site in the T-cell receptor-alpha (TCRA) enhancer and confers maximal enhancer activity. LEF1 belongs to a family of regulatory proteins that share homology with high mobility group protein-1 (HMG1). These high mobility groups regulate a vast array of cellular processes through the production of transcription factors, which go on to regulate some of the cells most vital processes, including chromatin remodeling, recombination, DNA replication, DNA repair and transcription. In this shared homology between LEF1 and other members of the HMG family, many of the mechanisms of action that can be seen in the way in which HMG1 interacts with histones, nucleosomes and other chromosomal components can be conferred in how LEF1 regulates many of the same cellular processes, as homology oftentimes helps to infer shared function. In fact, other members of the high mobility group (HMG), including TCF-1, have been shown to possess differential expression at different points within the embryogenesis of murine cells.

== Isoforms ==
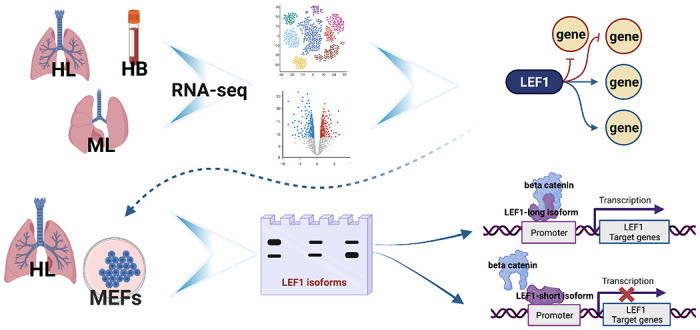
The implication of LEF1 short and long isoforms in Transcriptional Regulation

Along with its role in the regulation of the epithelial-mesenchymal transition (EMT) process, LEF1 has also been shown to be implicated in the processes of cellular senescence and aging. Different isoforms have been studied that have differential effects on these biological processes, once again demonstrating the pervasiveness of this family of genes in many different areas of cellular physiology. The biological process is often linked with the senescense-associated secretory phenotype (SASP), wherein aging cells secrete higher levels of immune modulators, pro-inflammatory cytokines, proteases and other biochemicals. These phenotypes that are implicated with SASP's are linked to other age related pathologies, including Chronic obstructive pulmonary disease (COPD) and Idiopathic pulmonary fibrosis (IPF), amongst a host of other comorbidities. While the short LEF1 isoform has been shown to be associated with exacerbation of the effects of cellular senescence, measurement of the activity of transcription factors/regulons associated with the long LEF1 isoform have demonstrated reversal of signs of cellular senescence through a currently unknown mechanism. Research is still being conducted to elucidate the role of these distinct isoforms in contributing to cellular senescence, but the current research has shown the important role LEF1 plays in regulating the transcription of downstream products associated with a wide range of cellular pathways.

== Regulation ==
In terms of the regulation of LEF1 itself, however, a number of enzymes like glycogen synthase kinase 3 (GSK3) and Integrin-linked kinase (ILK) will phosphorylate the β-catenin/(LEF/TCF) complexes, signaling for their activation. As previously mentioned, the signaling of these β-catenin molecules plays a central role in the recruitment and subsequent activation of the LEF/TCF proteins. Working as coregulators of one another, β-catenin and LEF/TCF proteins complex and go on to act downstream of the Wnt signaling pathway, whose ligands are highly expressed in tumors. Recently, some of the upstream molecules present in this Wnt signaling pathway have been elucidated that have connected the missing components. Modern molecular biological techniques helped to identify other upstream regulators of the β-catenin/(LEF/TCF) complex along with GSK3 and ILK, notably casein kinase I ε (CK1-ε). CK1-ε has been shown to be a positive regulator of the β-catenin/(LEF/TCF) complex and even mimics the identity of other proteins in the Wnt signaling pathway, thereby intensifying the effects that LEF and TCF proteins have on the cell.

== Clinical significance ==
LEF1 is highly overexpressed and associated with disease progression and poor prognosis in B-cell chronic lymphocytic leukemia and other kinds of malignancies like colorectal cancer. It is also a promising potential drug target.

Part of the capabilities of the LEF1 family of genes to be implicated in cancer growth is their ability to regulate the epithelial-mesenchymal transition (EMT) process, a cellular pathway by which the inhibition of genes responsible for producing adhesive properties and for polarizing the cell occurs. Though it can be activated independently of β-catenin, much of its effects result from the activation of this protein. When activated by β-catenin, LEF-1 transcription is upregulated and induces the inhibition of the genes which code for polarizing and adhesive properties of the cells. As a result of this LEF/β-catenin-induced inhibition, biochemical transformations take place that allow for heightened migratory and invasive capabilities, increased resistance to apoptosis, and the increased production of components of the extracellular matrix (ECM). Once the LEF1 cells have gained these properties and take on the form of mesenchymal stem cells, they are able to migrate away from their initial sources of attachment and this is when they can begin to exert their cancerous effects.

LEF1 has gained much notability recently for its prevalence in many cancerous pathologies, but even with this increased focus on the mechanisms by which LEF1 and the families of genes it is associated with, many of its downstream effects have not been fully elucidated. As a result, studies are continuing to be published surrounding the LEF1 family of genes, in order to fully expound upon its mechanism of action.

=== Expression in cancer ===
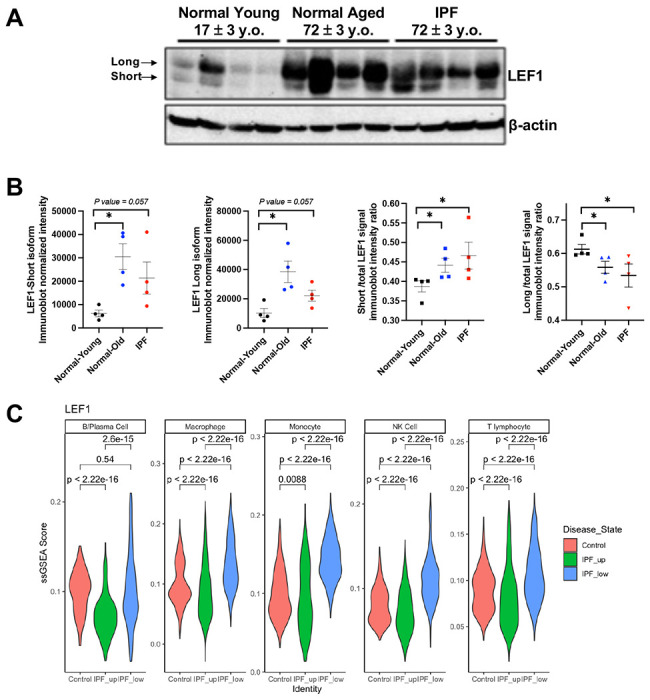
LEF1 Expression in Human Lung Tissue Lysates

LEF1 is highly overexpressed and associated with disease progression and poor prognosis in B-cell chronic lymphocytic leukemia and other kinds of malignancies like colorectal cancer. It is also a promising potential drug target. Due to its irregular expression common in these forms of cancer, as well as other forms like acute lymphoblastic leukemia (ALL), oral squamous cell carcinoma (OSCC) and even renal cell carcinomas (RCC), LEF1 has been heavily targeted as a drug candidate in a number of different studies. Many of these studies have proven effective in diminishing the growth, migration and invasion rates of tumorigenic cancer cells.

=== Drug inhibition ===
The investigation of the role of LEF1 in regards to aging is of extreme importance, as more effective and longevity based therapeutic interventions could be developed that target LEF1 and associated genes, in order to provide a means of minimizing the effects of age-related pathologies and increasing life span for those who are already at higher risk for other age-related comorbidities. The dysregulation of LEF1 has been shown to be highly correlated with the β-catenin binding domain, leading many researchers to consider the downstream effects of knocking out this binding domain and investigating the subsequent effects. The research has revealed that knocking out this domain downregulates the expression of the protein products of the LEF1 gene, and as a result, curtailing many of the deleterious effects rapid LEF1 proliferation and migration can have.

In fact, LEF1 silencing in cases of colorectal cancer has been demonstrated to increase the sensitivity of colorectal cancer cells to a number of Platinum-based drugs, including oxaliplatin, 5-FU and irinotecan. These Pt-based drugs act by inhibiting the synthesis of DNA molecules and covalently modifying molecules by forming DNA adducts. In turn, these drugs are able to promote apoptosis in the cancerous cells. Different isoforms of the LEF1 gene, including the long-form and the short-isoform/truncated dominant negative form (dnLEF1), have been shown to have differential effects on the pathology of colorectal cancer, although higher levels of activation in the Wnt/β-catenin signaling pathway in general are correlated with increased cancer stem cell properties in murine tumors. These associations have far reaching implications in regards to the fields of cancer biology and medicine in general, as the enhanced sensitivity of cancer cells to chemotherapeutic agents upon inhibition of the LEF1 family and the corresponding TCF-1, TCF-2, TCF-3 and TCF-4 genes, allows for the development of more drugs that can target the inhibition of this specific pathway and lower the morbidity and mortality rates for a diverse range of cancerous pathologies.

== Interactions ==
Lymphoid enhancer-binding factor 1 has been shown to interact with:

- ALX4,
- AML-1,
- Catenin beta-1/β-catenin/CTNNB1, including transgenically,
- EP300,
- MITF
- PIAS4,
- SMAD2, and
- SMAD3.
- ALX4, a protein encoded by the ALX4 gene found predominantly in the mesenchyme of developing embryonic limb buds. This protein is a potent transcriptional activator of the genes required during the development of the skeleton in the appendicular and craniofacial regions during embryonic development.
- AML-1, or acute-myeloid leukemia 1 protein, is a protein in humans encoded by the RUNX1 gene. It is also known as runt-related transcription factor 1 (RUNX1) and core-binding factor subunit alpha-2 (CBFA2), and plays an instrumental role in the development of pain-sensing neurons, as well as in the maturation of hematopoietic stem cells into mature blood cells. It was discovered by Nusslein-Volhard and Wieschaus during a screening of Drosophila in an attempt to elucidate specific mutations dealing with defects in the segmentation patterns and polarization of genes in Drosophila. Similar to the LEF1 interactions, AML-1 has been associated with mutational defects leading to a myriad of blood related pathologies. This list includes Familial Platelet Disorder, Acute myeloid leukemia, T-cell acute lymphoblastic leukemia (T-ALL), and multiple forms of myelodysplastic neoplasms.
- Catenin beta-1/β-catenin/CTNNB1, including transgenically, as this is a key component of the β-catenin and Wnt signaling pathway that the LEF1 protein plays a role in regulating. This role in transgenic expression has led to a number of studies done using modern genetic engineering techniques in order to determine the direct role of this Catenin beta-1/LEF1 association in the pathologies listed above. In fact, research has shown that LEF1 and β-catenin, when co-expressed in mammalian cells, combine with DNA in the nucleus to form a ternary complex. In turn, this activates the role of LEF1 as a transcription factor and demonstrates a mechanism by which signal transduction occurs from the Wnt proteins to the nucleus. This protein plays a role in both gene transcription of DNA to mRNA and cellular adhesion. As referenced earlier, β-catenin plays an integral role in the epithelial-to-mesenchymal transition, acting as a specific signaling molecule called a morphogen which helps guide development of cells in the later stages of embryonic development. Acting in tandem with LEF1, Catenin beta-1 causes certain epithelial cells to loosen their tight associations with the lumen and to adopt a looser and more fluid identity, similar to those seen by cells in the mesenchyme. This loosening of their associations causes the epithelial cells to inactive a number of proteins associated with adhesion and to activate a host of other proteins expressed in resident cells of the mesenchyme. These molecules include vimentin, alpha smooth muscle actin (ACTA2) and fibroblast-specific protein 1 (FSP1).
- EP300,
- MITF
- PIAS4,
- SMAD2, and
- SMAD3.
