= ALX4 =

Protein-coding gene in the species Homo sapiens

Identifiers
- Aliases: ALX4, CRS5, FND2, ALX homeobox 4
- External IDs: OMIM: 605420; MGI: 108359; GeneCards: ALX4
Available structures
PDB	Ortholog search: PDBe RCSB
PDB	List of PDB id codes 2M0C

Gene location (Human)
Chr.	Chromosome 11 (human)
Band	11p11.2	Start	44,260,440 bp
Band	11p11.2	End	44,310,139 bp

Gene location (Mouse)
Chr.	Chromosome 2 (mouse)
Band	2 E1|2 51.62 cM	Start	93,472,729 bp
Band	2 E1|2 51.62 cM	End	93,511,684 bp
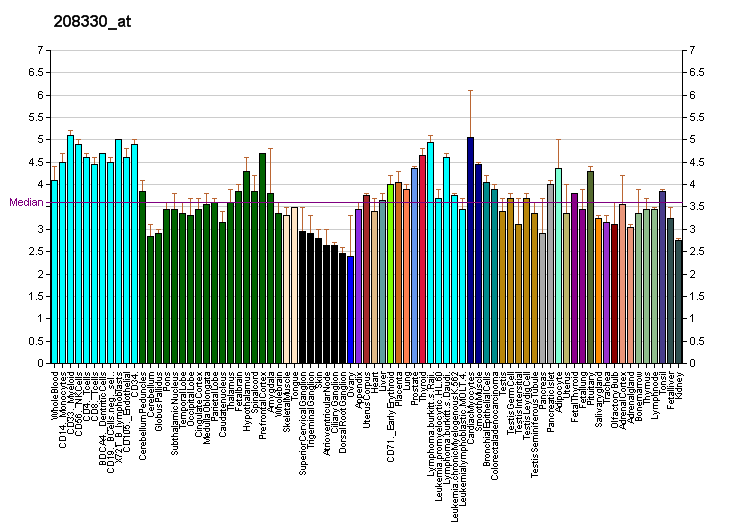
RNA expression pattern
Bgee	Human / Mouse (ortholog); Top expressed in: gonad; olfactory zone of nasal mucosa; tendon; muscle of thigh; Achilles tendon; ganglionic eminence; skin of abdomen; skin of leg; skeletal muscle tissue; prefrontal cortex / Top expressed in: genital tubercle; medial nasal prominence; urethra; male urethra; lateral nasal prominence; hair; lip; mandible; tongue; extraocular muscle; More reference expression data
BioGPS	More reference expression data
Gene ontology
Molecular function	DNA binding; sequence-specific DNA binding; RNA polymerase II transcription regulatory region sequence-specific DNA binding; DNA-binding transcription factor activity; DNA-binding transcription activator activity, RNA polymerase II-specific; HMG box domain binding; protein heterodimerization activity; DNA-binding transcription factor activity, RNA polymerase II-specific
Cellular component	transcription regulator complex; nucleus
Biological process	regulation of apoptotic process; hair follicle development; embryonic skeletal system morphogenesis; pattern specification process; skeletal system development; roof of mouth development; regulation of transcription, DNA-templated; limb morphogenesis; regulation of transcription by RNA polymerase II; skeletal system morphogenesis; muscle organ development; embryonic digit morphogenesis; transcription by RNA polymerase II; post-embryonic development; transcription, DNA-templated; multicellular organism development; digestive tract development; embryonic forelimb morphogenesis; anterior/posterior pattern specification; positive regulation of transcription by RNA polymerase II; embryonic hindlimb morphogenesis
Sources:Amigo / QuickGO
Orthologs
Databases	NCBI: entry; OMA: entry
Species	Human	Mouse
Entrez	60529	11695
Ensembl	ENSG00000052850	ENSMUSG00000040310
UniProt	Q9H161	O35137
RefSeq (mRNA)	NM_021926	NM_007442
RefSeq (protein)	NP_068745	NP_031468
Location (UCSC)	Chr 11: 44.26 – 44.31 Mb	Chr 2: 93.47 – 93.51 Mb
PubMed search
- Wikidata
View/Edit Human	View/Edit Mouse

Homeobox protein aristaless-like 4 is a protein that in humans is encoded by the ALX4 gene. Alx4 belongs to the group-1 aristaless-related genes, a majority of which are linked to the development of the craniofacial and/or appendicular skeleton, along with PRRX1, SHOX, ALX3, and CART1. The Alx4 protein acts as a transcriptional activator and is predominantly expressed in the mesenchyme of the developing embryonic limb buds. Transcripts of this gene are detectable in the lateral plate mesoderm just prior to limb induction. Alx4 expression plays a major role in the determination of spatial orientation of the growing limb bud by aiding in the establishment of anteroposterior polarity of the limb. It does this by working in conjunction with Gli3 and dHand to restrict the expression of Sonic Hedgehog (SHh) to the posterior mesenchyme, which will eventually give rise to the Zone of Polarizing Activity (ZPA). This gene has been proven to be allelic with mutations and deletions giving rise to a host of craniofacial dismorphologies and several forms of polydactyly in mammalian development. A mouse-model knockout of this gene, dubbed Strong's luxoid, was originally created by Forstheofel in the 1960s and has been extensively studied to understand the partial and complete loss-of-function properties of this gene.

== Interactions ==
ALX4 has been shown to interact with Lymphoid enhancer-binding factor 1.
