= SOCS2 =

Protein-coding gene in the species Homo sapiens

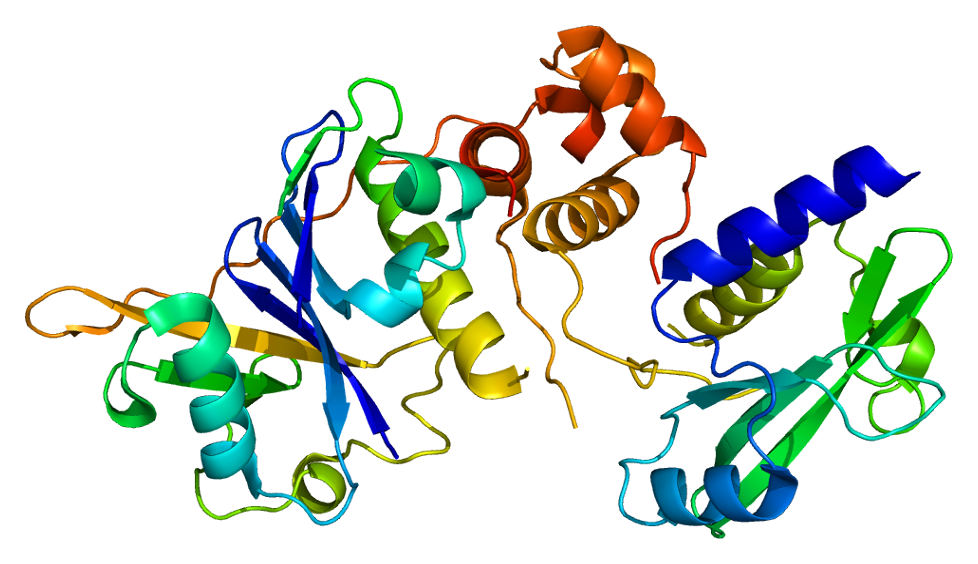

Identifiers
- Aliases: SOCS2, CIS2, Cish2, SOCS-2, SSI-2, SSI2, STATI2, suppressor of cytokine signaling 2
- External IDs: OMIM: 605117; MGI: 1201787; GeneCards: SOCS2
Available structures
PDB	Ortholog search: PDBe RCSB
PDB	List of PDB id codes 2C9W, 4JGH, 5BO4

Gene location (Human)
Chr.	Chromosome 12 (human)
Band	12q22	Start	93,569,814 bp
Band	12q22	End	93,583,487 bp

Gene location (Mouse)
Chr.	Chromosome 10 (mouse)
Band	10 C2|10 49.35 cM	Start	95,221,224 bp
Band	10 C2|10 49.35 cM	End	95,253,042 bp
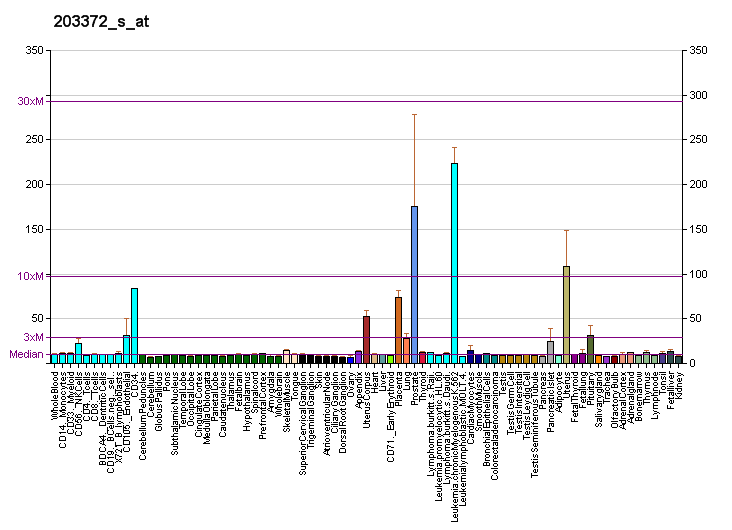

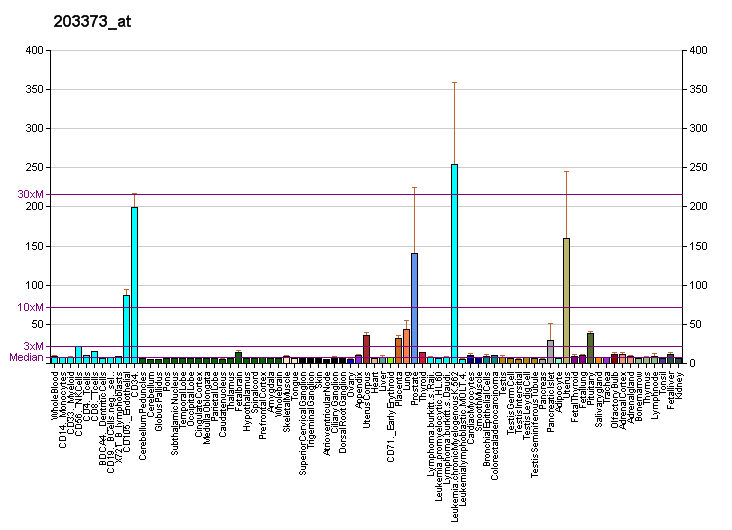
RNA expression pattern
Bgee	Human / Mouse (ortholog); Top expressed in: secondary oocyte; canal of the cervix; vena cava; body of uterus; myometrium; seminal vesicula; Epithelium of choroid plexus; ectocervix; prostate; pituitary gland / Top expressed in: cumulus cell; Ileal epithelium; olfactory epithelium; vestibular membrane of cochlear duct; left lung lobe; vestibular sensory epithelium; stria vascularis; Gonadal ridge; right lung; interventricular septum; More reference expression data
BioGPS	More reference expression data
Gene ontology
Molecular function	insulin-like growth factor receptor binding; protein kinase inhibitor activity; JAK pathway signal transduction adaptor activity; protein binding; growth hormone receptor binding; 1-phosphatidylinositol-3-kinase regulator activity
Cellular component	cytoplasm; cytosol; phosphatidylinositol 3-kinase complex
Biological process	receptor signaling pathway via JAK-STAT; response to estradiol; intracellular signal transduction; negative regulation of protein kinase activity; cytokine-mediated signaling pathway; negative regulation of apoptotic process; negative regulation of insulin receptor signaling pathway; cellular response to hormone stimulus; growth hormone receptor signaling pathway; regulation of signal transduction; regulation of cell growth; protein ubiquitination; regulation of growth; negative regulation of signal transduction; negative regulation of receptor signaling pathway via JAK-STAT; positive regulation of signal transduction; lactation; regulation of multicellular organism growth; negative regulation of multicellular organism growth; post-translational protein modification; positive regulation of neuron differentiation; mammary gland alveolus development; interleukin-7-mediated signaling pathway; regulation of phosphatidylinositol 3-kinase activity; phosphatidylinositol phosphate biosynthetic process
Sources:Amigo / QuickGO
Orthologs
Databases	NCBI: entry; OMA: entry
Species	Human	Mouse
Entrez	8835	216233
Ensembl	ENSG00000120833	ENSMUSG00000020027
UniProt	O14508	O35717
RefSeq (mRNA)	NM_001270467; NM_001270468; NM_001270469; NM_001270470; NM_001270471 NM_003877	NM_001168655; NM_001168656; NM_001168657; NM_007706
RefSeq (protein)	NP_001257396; NP_001257397; NP_001257398; NP_001257399; NP_001257400 NP_003868	NP_001162126; NP_001162127; NP_001162128; NP_031732
Location (UCSC)	Chr 12: 93.57 – 93.58 Mb	Chr 10: 95.22 – 95.25 Mb
PubMed search
- Wikidata
View/Edit Human	View/Edit Mouse

Suppressor of cytokine signaling 2 is a protein that in humans is encoded by the SOCS2 gene.

This gene encodes a member of the STAT-induced STAT inhibitor (SSI), also known as suppressor of cytokine signalling (SOCS), family. SSI family members are cytokine-inducible negative regulators of cytokine signaling. The expression of this gene can be induced by a subset of cytokines, including erythropoietin, GM-CSF, IL10 and interferon-gamma (IFN-gamma). The protein encoded by this gene is found to interact with the cytoplasmic domain of insulin-like growth factor 1 receptor (IGF1R), and thus is thought to be involved in the regulation of IGF1R mediated cell signaling. Knockout studies in mice also suggested a regulatory role of this gene in IGF-1 related growth control.

== Interactions ==
SOCS2 has been shown to interact with insulin-like growth factor 1 receptor and erythropoietin receptor. Additionally, it acts as a substrate recognition subunit of a Cullin5 E3 ubiquitin ligase complex. It is under investigation for use in targeted protein degradation.
