= Erythropoietin receptor =

Protein-coding gene in the species Homo sapiens

EPOR
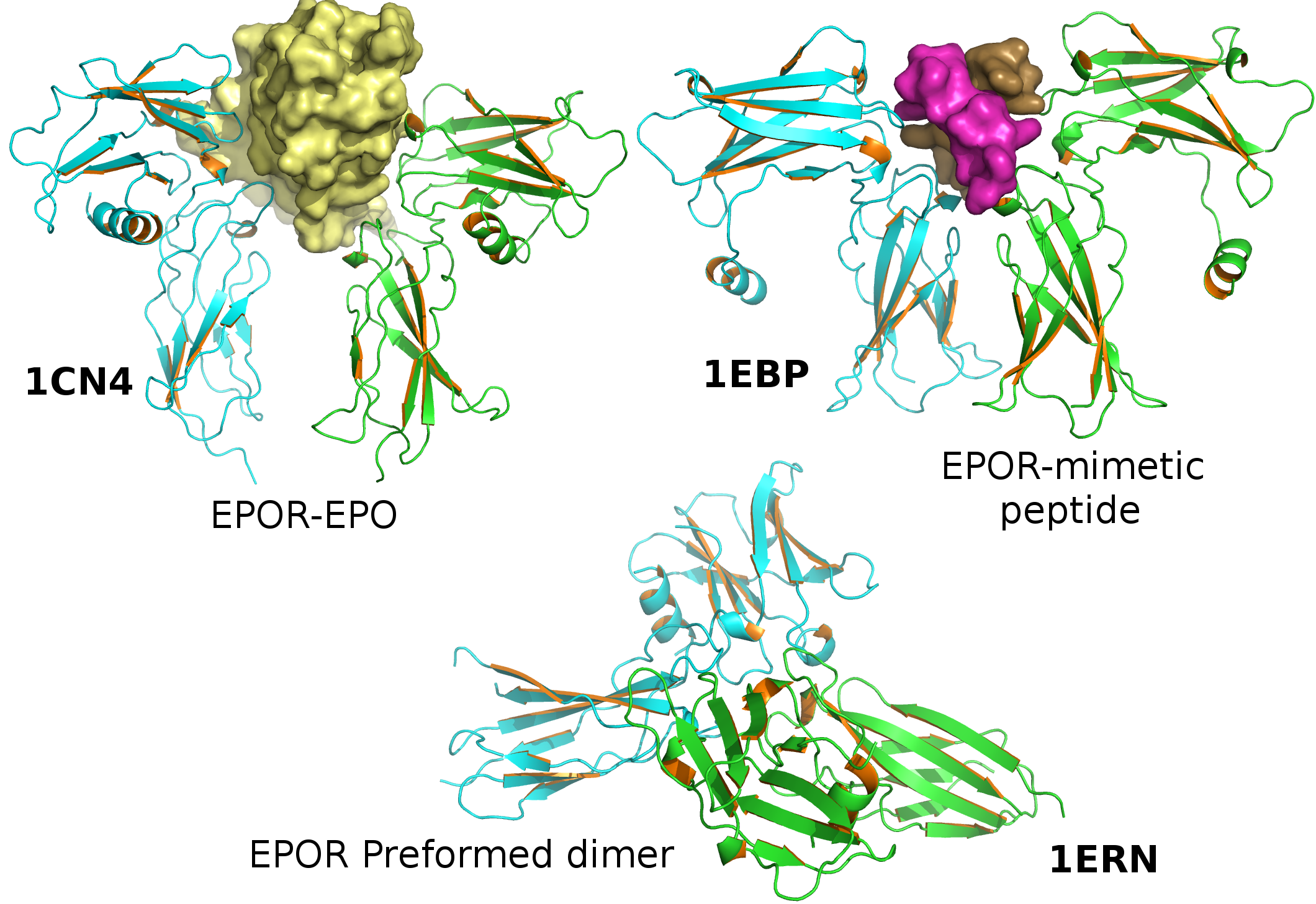

Identifiers
- Aliases: EPOR, EPO-R, erythropoietin receptor
- External IDs: OMIM: 133171; MGI: 95408; GeneCards: EPOR
Available structures
PDB	Ortholog search: PDBe RCSB
PDB	List of PDB id codes 1CN4, 1EBA, 1EBP, 1EER, 1ERN, 2JIX, 2MV6, 4Y5V, 4Y5X, 4Y5Y

Gene location (Human)
Chr.	Chromosome 19 (human)
Band	19p13.2	Start	11,377,207 bp
Band	19p13.2	End	11,384,342 bp

Gene location (Mouse)
Chr.	Chromosome 9 (mouse)
Band	9 A3|9 7.93 cM	Start	21,870,193 bp
Band	9 A3|9 7.93 cM	End	21,874,802 bp
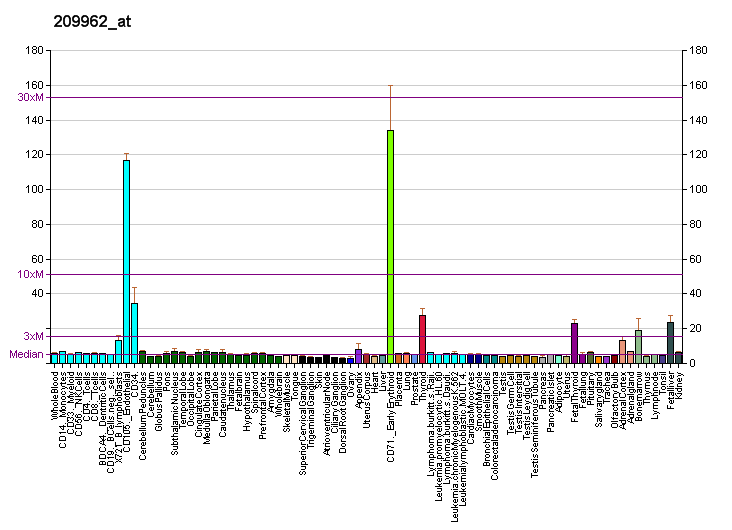

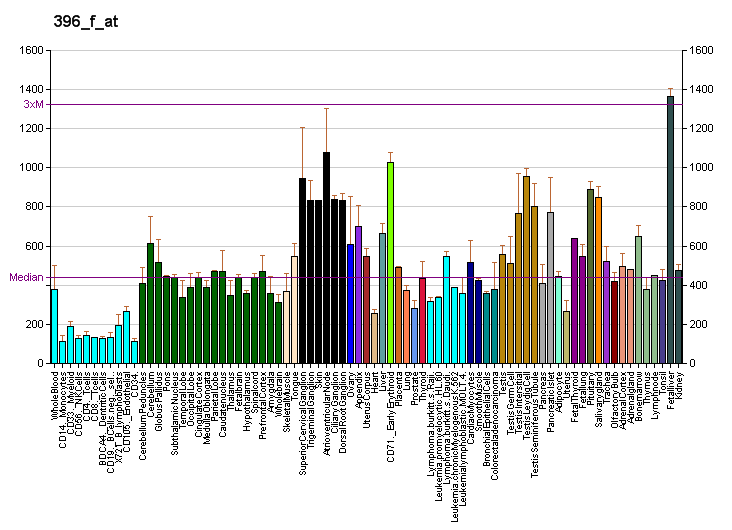

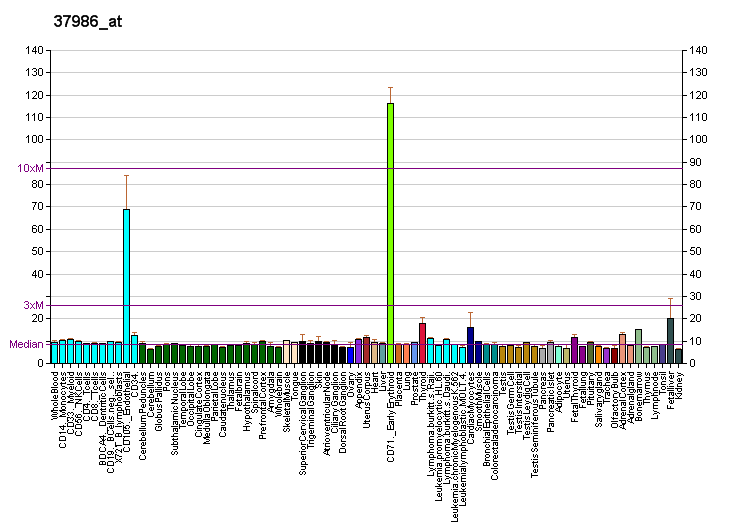
RNA expression pattern
Bgee	Human / Mouse (ortholog); Top expressed in: beta cell; olfactory bulb; left lobe of thyroid gland; right lobe of thyroid gland; parotid gland; thoracic diaphragm; tibialis anterior muscle; right uterine tube; left adrenal cortex; cardia / Top expressed in: fetal liver hematopoietic progenitor cell; tibiofemoral joint; yolk sac; embryo; spleen; bone marrow; urethra; female urethra; tail of embryo; male urethra; More reference expression data
BioGPS	More reference expression data
Gene ontology
Molecular function	protein binding; identical protein binding; cytokine receptor activity; transmembrane signaling receptor activity; erythropoietin receptor activity
Cellular component	integral component of membrane; membrane; plasma membrane; integral component of plasma membrane; extracellular region
Biological process	cytokine-mediated signaling pathway; development of the heart; brain development; decidualization; signal transduction; erythropoietin-mediated signaling pathway; positive regulation of phosphatidylinositol 3-kinase signaling; positive regulation of Ras protein signal transduction
Sources:Amigo / QuickGO
Orthologs
Databases	NCBI: entry; OMA: entry
Species	Human	Mouse
Entrez	2057	13857
Ensembl	ENSG00000187266	ENSMUSG00000006235
UniProt	P19235	P14753
RefSeq (mRNA)	NM_000121	NM_010149
RefSeq (protein)	NP_000112	NP_034279
Location (UCSC)	Chr 19: 11.38 – 11.38 Mb	Chr 9: 21.87 – 21.87 Mb
PubMed search
- Wikidata
View/Edit Human	View/Edit Mouse

The erythropoietin receptor (EpoR) is a protein that in humans is encoded by the EPOR gene. EpoR is a 52 kDa peptide with a single carbohydrate chain resulting in an approximately 56–57 kDa protein found on the surface of EPO responding cells. It is a member of the cytokine receptor family. EpoR pre-exists as dimers. These dimers were originally thought to be formed by extracellular domain interactions, however, it is now assumed that it is formed by interactions of the transmembrane domain and that the original structure of the extracellular interaction site was due to crystallisation conditions and does not depict the native conformation. Binding of a 30 kDa ligand erythropoietin (Epo), changes the receptor's conformational change, resulting in the autophosphorylation of Jak2 kinases that are pre-associated with the receptor (i.e., EpoR does not possess intrinsic kinase activity and depends on Jak2 activity). At present, the best-established function of EpoR is to promote proliferation and rescue of erythroid (red blood cell) progenitors from apoptosis.

== Function and mechanism of action ==
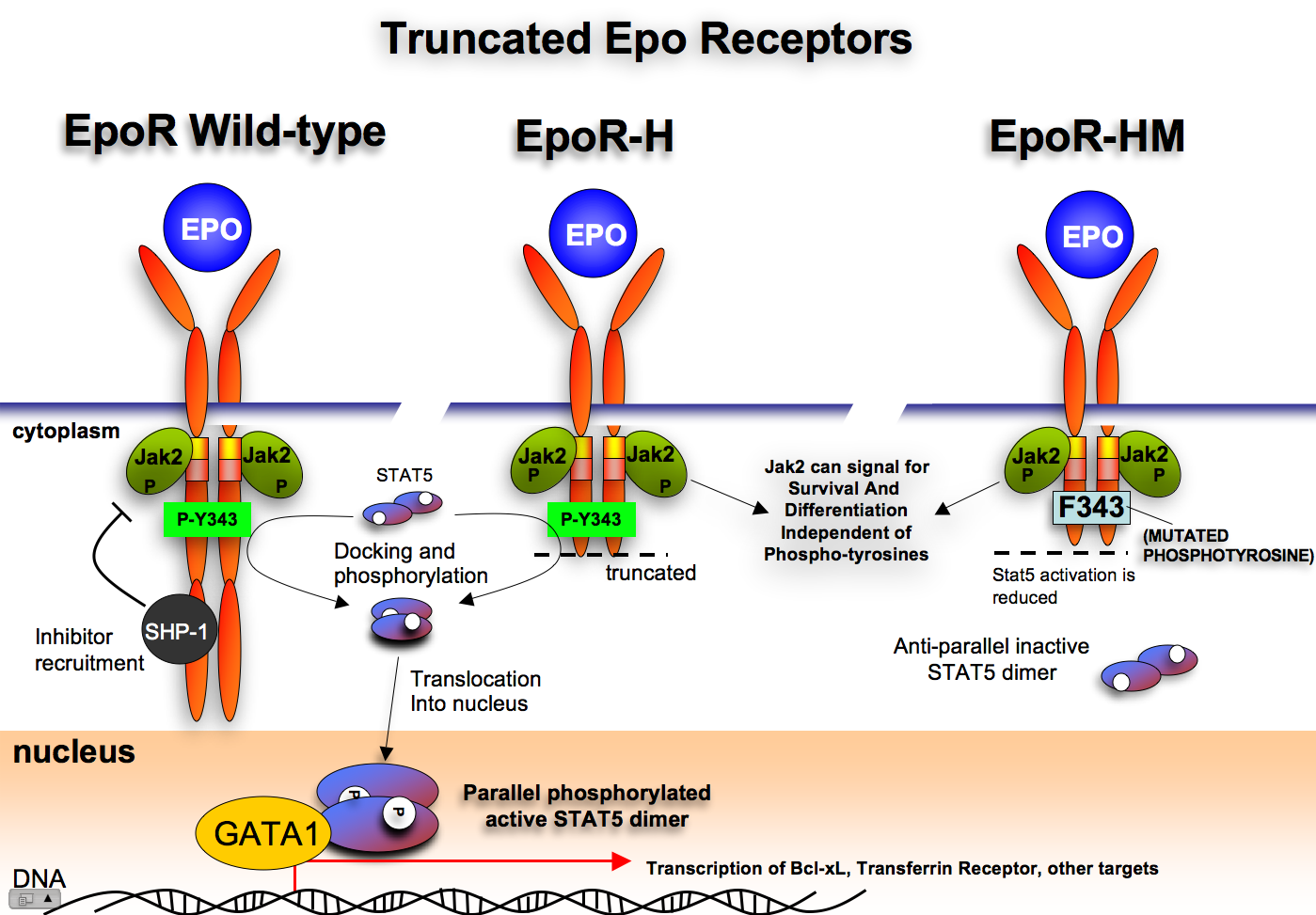
Murine Epo Receptor truncations and known functions. Erythroid differentiation depends on transcriptional regulator GATA1. EpoR is thought to contribute to differentiation via multiple signaling pathways including the STAT5 pathway. In erythropoiesis, EpoR is best known for inducing survival of progenitors.

The cytoplasmic domains of the EpoR contain a number of phosphotyrosines that are phosphorylated by Jak2 and serve as docking sites for a variety of intracellular pathway activators and Stats (such as Stat5). In addition to activating Ras/AKT and ERK/MAP kinase, phosphatidylinositol 3-kinase/AKT pathway and STAT transcription factors, phosphotyrosines also serve as docking sites for phosphatases that negatively affect EpoR signaling in order to prevent overactivation that may lead to such disorders as erythrocytosis. In general, the defects in the erythropoietin receptor may produce erythroleukemia and familial erythrocytosis. Mutations in Jak2 kinases associated with EpoR can also lead to polycythemia vera.

=== Erythroid survival ===
Primary role of EpoR is to promote proliferation of erythroid progenitor cells and rescue erythroid progenitors from cell death. EpoR induced Jak2-Stat5 signaling, together with transcriptional factor GATA-1, induces the transcription of pro-survival protein Bcl-xL. Additionally, EpoR has been implicated in suppressing expression of death receptors Fas, Trail and TNFa that negatively affect erythropoiesis.

Based on current evidence, it is still unknown whether Epo/EpoR directly cause "proliferation and differentiation" of erythroid progenitors in vivo, although such direct effects have been described based on in vitro work.

=== Erythroid differentiation ===
It is thought that erythroid differentiation is primarily dependent on the presence and induction of erythroid transcriptional factors such as GATA-1, FOG-1 and EKLF, as well as the suppression of myeloid/lymphoid transcriptional factors such as PU.1. Direct and significant effects of EpoR signaling specifically upon the induction of erythroid-specific genes such as beta-globin, have been mainly elusive. It is known that GATA-1 can induce EpoR expression. In turn, EpoR's PI3-K/AKT signaling pathway augments GATA-1 activity.

=== Erythroid cell cycle/proliferation ===
Induction of proliferation by the EpoR is likely cell type-dependent. It is known that EpoR can activate mitogenic signaling pathways and can lead to cell proliferation in erythroleukemic cell lines in vitro, various non-erythroid cells, and cancer cells. So far, there is no sufficient evidence that in vivo, EpoR signaling can induce erythroid progenitors to undergo cell division, or whether Epo levels can modulate the cell cycle. EpoR signaling may still have a proliferation effect upon BFU-e progenitors, but these progenitors cannot be directly identified, isolated and studied. CFU-e progenitors enter the cell cycle at the time of GATA-1 induction and PU.1 suppression in a developmental manner rather than due to EpoR signaling. Subsequent differentiation stages (proerythroblast to orthochromatic erythroblast) involve a decrease in cell size and eventual expulsion of the nucleus, and are likely dependent upon EpoR signaling only for their survival. In addition, some evidence on macrocytosis in hypoxic stress (when Epo can increase 1000-fold) suggests that mitosis is actually skipped in later erythroid stages, when EpoR expression is low/absent, in order to provide emergency reserve of red blood cells as soon as possible. Such data, though sometimes circumstantial, argue that there is limited capacity to proliferate specifically in response to Epo (and not other factors). Together, these data suggest that EpoR in erythroid differentiation may function primarily as a survival factor, while its effect on the cell cycle (for example, rate of division and corresponding changes in the levels of cyclins and Cdk inhibitors) in vivo awaits further work. In other cell systems, however, EpoR may provide a specific proliferative signal.

=== Commitment of multipotent progenitors to the erythroid lineage ===
EpoR's role in lineage commitment is currently unclear. EpoR expression can extend as far back as the hematopoietic stem cell compartment. It is unknown whether EpoR signaling plays a permissive (i.e. induces only survival) or an instructive (i.e. upregulates erythroid markers to lock progenitors to a predetermined differentiation path) role in early, multipotent progenitors in order to produce sufficient erythroblast numbers. Current publications in the field suggest that it is primarily permissive. The generation of BFU-e and CFU-e progenitors was shown to be normal in rodent embryos knocked out for either Epo or EpoR. An argument against such lack of requirement is that in response to Epo or hypoxic stress, the number of early erythroid stages, the BFU-e and CFU-e, increases dramatically. However, it is unclear if it is an instructive signal or, again, a permissive signal. One additional point is that signaling pathways activated by the EpoR are common to many other receptors; replacing EpoR with prolactin receptor supports erythroid survival and differentiation in vitro. Together, these data suggest that commitment to erythroid lineage likely does not happen due to EpoR's as-yet-unknown instructive function, but possibly due to its role in survival at the multipotent progenitor stages.

== Animal studies on Epo Receptor mutations ==
Mice with truncated EpoR are viable, which suggests Jak2 activity is sufficient to support basal erythropoiesis by activating the necessary pathways without phosphotyrosine docking sites being needed. EpoR-H form of EpoR truncation contains the first, and, what can be argued, the most important tyrosine 343 that serves as a docking site for the Stat5 molecule, but lacks the rest of the cytoplasmic tail. These mice exhibit elevated erythropoiesis consistent with the idea that phosphatase recruitment (and therefore the shutting down of signaling) is aberrant in these mice.

The EpoR-HM receptor also lacks the majority of the cytoplasmic domain, and contains the tyrosine 343 that was mutated to phenylalanine, making it unsuitable for efficient Stat5 docking and activation. These mice are anemic and show poor response to hypoxic stress, such as phenylhydrazine treatment or erythropoietin injection.

EpoR knockout mice have defects in heart, brain and the vasculature. These defects may be due to blocks in RBC formation and thus insufficient oxygen delivery to developing tissues because mice engineered to express Epo receptors only in erythroid cells develop normally.

== Clinical significance ==
Defects in the erythropoietin receptor may produce erythroleukemia and familial erythrocytosis. Overproduction of red blood cells increases a chance of adverse cardiovascular event, such as thrombosis and stroke.

Rarely, seemingly beneficial mutations in the EpoR may arise, where increased red blood cell number allows for improved oxygen delivery in athletic endurance events with no apparent adverse effects upon the athlete's health (as for example in the Finnish athlete Eero Mäntyranta).

Erythropoietin was reported to maintain endothelial cells and to promote tumor angiogenesis, hence the dysregulation of EpoR may affect the growth of certain tumors. However this hypothesis is not universally accepted.

== Interactions ==
Erythropoietin receptor has been shown to interact with:

- CRKL,
- Erythropoietin,
- Grb2,
- Janus kinase 2,
- LYN,
- PIK3R1,
- PTPN6,
- SOCS2,
- SOCS3, and
- STAT5A.
