= PTPN2 =

Protein-coding gene in the species Homo sapiens

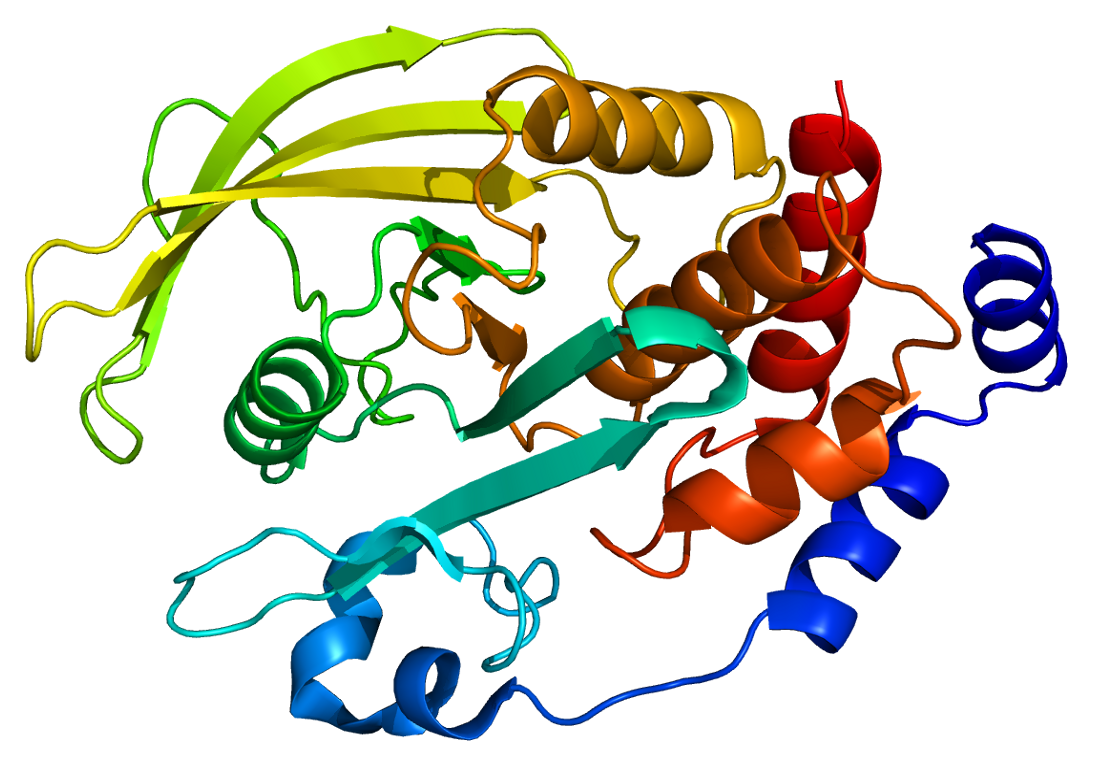

Identifiers
- Aliases: PTPN2, PTN2, PTPT, TC-PTP, TCELLPTP, TCPTP, protein tyrosine phosphatase, non-receptor type 2, protein tyrosine phosphatase non-receptor type 2
- External IDs: OMIM: 176887; MGI: 97806; GeneCards: PTPN2
Available structures
PDB	Ortholog search: PDBe RCSB
PDB	List of PDB id codes 1L8K
Enzyme activity
EC #	BRENDA	ExPASy	KEGG	MetaCyc
3.1.3.48	↗	↗	↗	↗

Gene location (Human)
Chr.	Chromosome 18 (human)
Band	18p11.21	Start	12,785,478 bp
Band	18p11.21	End	12,929,643 bp

Gene location (Mouse)
Chr.	Chromosome 18 (mouse)
Band	18|18 E1	Start	67,798,581 bp
Band	18|18 E1	End	67,857,665 bp
RNA expression pattern
Bgee	Human / Mouse (ortholog); Top expressed in: tendon of biceps brachii; monocyte; granulocyte; tonsil; cartilage tissue; parotid gland; oocyte; lymph node; body of pancreas; gonad / Top expressed in: otic placode; saccule; condyle; primary oocyte; fossa; Paneth cell; hair follicle; secondary oocyte; submandibular gland; primitive streak; More reference expression data
BioGPS	n/a
Gene ontology
Molecular function	protein binding; protein kinase binding; phosphatase activity; integrin binding; phosphoprotein phosphatase activity; syntaxin binding; non-membrane spanning protein tyrosine phosphatase activity; receptor tyrosine kinase binding; hydrolase activity; protein tyrosine phosphatase activity; STAT family protein binding
Cellular component	cytoplasm; membrane; plasma membrane; endoplasmic reticulum; nucleus; endoplasmic reticulum-Golgi intermediate compartment; nucleoplasm; cytosol
Biological process	negative regulation of type I interferon-mediated signaling pathway; negative regulation of epidermal growth factor receptor signaling pathway; positive regulation of PERK-mediated unfolded protein response; dephosphorylation; negative regulation of interleukin-4-mediated signaling pathway; positive regulation of endoplasmic reticulum stress-induced intrinsic apoptotic signaling pathway; negative regulation of interleukin-6-mediated signaling pathway; negative regulation of cell population proliferation; protein dephosphorylation; negative regulation of interleukin-2-mediated signaling pathway; regulation of interferon-gamma-mediated signaling pathway; negative regulation of protein tyrosine kinase activity; regulation of hepatocyte growth factor receptor signaling pathway; negative regulation of platelet-derived growth factor receptor-beta signaling pathway; insulin receptor signaling pathway; negative regulation of interferon-gamma-mediated signaling pathway; glucose homeostasis; negative regulation of chemotaxis; negative regulation of tumor necrosis factor-mediated signaling pathway; negative regulation of macrophage differentiation; negative regulation of T cell receptor signaling pathway; negative regulation of positive thymic T cell selection; negative regulation of insulin receptor signaling pathway; T cell differentiation; negative regulation of ERK1 and ERK2 cascade; erythrocyte differentiation; negative regulation of lipid storage; B cell differentiation; peptidyl-tyrosine dephosphorylation; positive regulation of gluconeogenesis; negative regulation of macrophage colony-stimulating factor signaling pathway; negative regulation of inflammatory response; negative regulation of transcription by RNA polymerase II; negative regulation of tyrosine phosphorylation of STAT protein; cellular response to cytokine stimulus
Sources:Amigo / QuickGO
Orthologs
Databases	NCBI: entry; OMA: entry
Species	Human	Mouse
Entrez	5771	19255
Ensembl	ENSG00000175354	ENSMUSG00000024539
UniProt	P17706	Q06180
RefSeq (mRNA)	NM_001207013; NM_001308287; NM_002828; NM_080422; NM_080423	NM_001127177; NM_008977
RefSeq (protein)	NP_001193942; NP_001295216; NP_002819; NP_536347; NP_536348	NP_001120649; NP_033003
Location (UCSC)	Chr 18: 12.79 – 12.93 Mb	Chr 18: 67.8 – 67.86 Mb
PubMed search
- Wikidata
View/Edit Human	View/Edit Mouse

Tyrosine-protein phosphatase non-receptor type 2 is an enzyme that in humans is encoded by the PTPN2 gene.

The protein encoded by this gene is a member of the protein tyrosine phosphatase (PTP) family. Members of the PTP family share a highly conserved catalytic motif, which is essential for the catalytic activity. PTPs are known to be signaling molecules that regulate a variety of cellular processes including cell growth, differentiation, mitotic cycle, and oncogenic transformation.

Epidermal growth factor receptor and the adaptor protein Shc were reported to be substrates of this PTP, which suggested the roles in growth factor mediated cell signaling. Three alternatively spliced variants of this gene, which encode isoforms differing at their extreme C-termini, have been described.

The different C-termini are thought to determine the substrate specificity, as well as the cellular localization of the isoforms. Two highly related but distinctly processed pseudogenes that localize to distinct chromosomes have been reported.
