= SOCS4 =

Protein-coding gene in the species Homo sapiens

Identifiers
- Aliases: SOCS4, SOCS7, suppressor of cytokine signaling 4
- External IDs: OMIM: 616337; MGI: 1914546; GeneCards: SOCS4
Available structures
PDB	Ortholog search: PDBe RCSB
PDB	List of PDB id codes 2IZV

Gene location (Human)
Chr.	Chromosome 14 (human)
Band	14q22.3	Start	55,027,230 bp
Band	14q22.3	End	55,049,489 bp

Gene location (Mouse)
Chr.	Chromosome 14 (mouse)
Band	14|14 C1	Start	47,514,388 bp
Band	14|14 C1	End	47,533,559 bp
RNA expression pattern
Bgee	Human / Mouse (ortholog); Top expressed in: pancreatic epithelial cell; tibia; visceral pleura; parietal pleura; tail of epididymis; germinal epithelium; mucosa of ileum; mucosa of paranasal sinus; cardiac muscle tissue of right atrium; tibialis anterior muscle / Top expressed in: medial ganglionic eminence; conjunctival fornix; vestibular membrane of cochlear duct; epithelium of small intestine; carotid body; atrioventricular valve; lymph node; trigeminal ganglion; lumbar spinal ganglion; hair follicle; More reference expression data
BioGPS	n/a
Gene ontology
Molecular function	protein kinase inhibitor activity; protein binding
Cellular component	cytoplasm; intracellular anatomical structure
Biological process	negative regulation of epidermal growth factor-activated receptor activity; regulation of growth; negative regulation of signal transduction; intracellular signal transduction; positive regulation of proteasomal ubiquitin-dependent protein catabolic process; protein ubiquitination; cytokine-mediated signaling pathway; negative regulation of receptor signaling pathway via JAK-STAT
Sources:Amigo / QuickGO
Orthologs
Databases	NCBI: entry; OMA: entry
Species	Human	Mouse
Entrez	122809	67296
Ensembl	ENSG00000180008	ENSMUSG00000048379
UniProt	Q8WXH5	Q91ZA6
RefSeq (mRNA)	NM_080867; NM_199421	NM_080843
RefSeq (protein)	NP_543143; NP_955453	NP_543119
Location (UCSC)	Chr 14: 55.03 – 55.05 Mb	Chr 14: 47.51 – 47.53 Mb
PubMed search
- Wikidata
View/Edit Human	View/Edit Mouse

Suppressor of cytokine signaling 4 is a protein that in humans is encoded by the SOCS4 gene.

== Function ==
The protein encoded by this gene contains a SH2 domain and a SOCS BOX domain. The protein thus belongs to the suppressor of cytokine signaling (SOCS), also known as STAT-induced STAT inhibitor (SSI), protein family. SOCS family members are known to be cytokine-inducible negative regulators of cytokine signaling. Two alternatively spliced transcript variants encoding the same protein have been found for this gene.
