= PIAS4 =

Protein-coding gene in the species Homo sapiens

Identifiers
- Aliases: PIAS4, PIASY, Piasg, ZMIZ6, PIAS-gamma, protein inhibitor of activated STAT 4
- External IDs: OMIM: 605989; MGI: 2136940; GeneCards: PIAS4
Enzyme activity
EC #	BRENDA	ExPASy	KEGG	MetaCyc
2.3.2.27	↗	↗	↗	↗

Gene location (Human)
Chr.	Chromosome 19 (human)
Band	19p13.3	Start	4,007,736 bp
Band	19p13.3	End	4,039,386 bp

Gene location (Mouse)
Chr.	Chromosome 10 (mouse)
Band	10|10 C1	Start	80,989,100 bp
Band	10|10 C1	End	81,003,757 bp
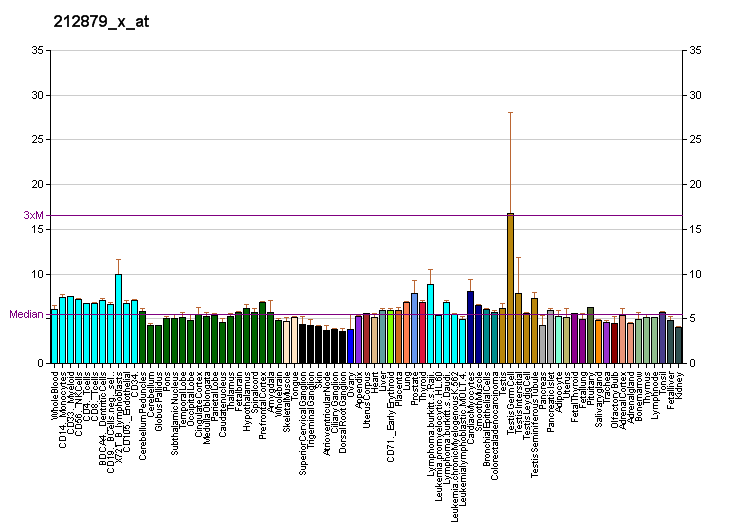

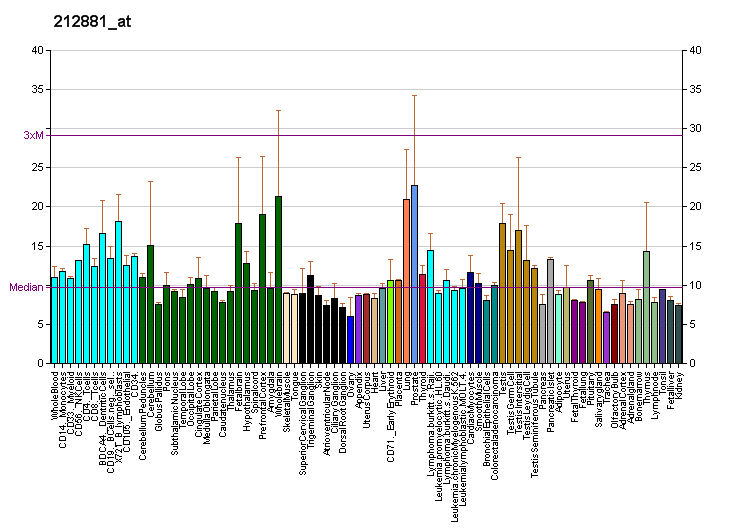
RNA expression pattern
Bgee	Human / Mouse (ortholog); Top expressed in: left testis; right testis; right hemisphere of cerebellum; stromal cell of endometrium; oocyte; sural nerve; islet of Langerhans; muscle of thigh; muscle layer of sigmoid colon; monocyte / Top expressed in: seminiferous tubule; internal carotid artery; spermatid; external carotid artery; tibiofemoral joint; primary oocyte; crypt of lieberkuhn of small intestine; secondary oocyte; granulocyte; zygote; More reference expression data
BioGPS	More reference expression data
Gene ontology
Molecular function	DNA binding; transcription corepressor activity; zinc ion binding; metal ion binding; SUMO ligase activity; protein binding; ubiquitin protein ligase binding; SUMO transferase activity; transferase activity; protein C-terminus binding
Cellular component	cytoplasm; PML body; nuclear matrix; transferase complex; nucleus; nucleoplasm
Biological process	regulation of transcription, DNA-templated; positive regulation of keratinocyte apoptotic process; negative regulation of tumor necrosis factor-mediated signaling pathway; negative regulation of transcription by RNA polymerase II; Wnt signaling pathway; positive regulation of protein sumoylation; protein sumoylation; transcription, DNA-templated; positive regulation of intrinsic apoptotic signaling pathway in response to DNA damage; negative regulation of transcription, DNA-templated; double-strand break repair via nonhomologous end joining; negative regulation of NF-kappaB transcription factor activity; vitamin D metabolic process
Sources:Amigo / QuickGO
Orthologs
Databases	NCBI: entry; OMA: entry
Species	Human	Mouse
Entrez	51588	59004
Ensembl	ENSG00000105229	ENSMUSG00000004934
UniProt	Q8N2W9	Q9JM05
RefSeq (mRNA)	NM_015897; NM_016149	NM_021501
RefSeq (protein)	NP_056981	NP_067476
Location (UCSC)	Chr 19: 4.01 – 4.04 Mb	Chr 10: 80.99 – 81 Mb
PubMed search
- Wikidata
View/Edit Human	View/Edit Mouse

E3 SUMO-protein ligase PIAS4 is one of several protein inhibitor of activated STAT (PIAS) proteins. It is also known as a protein inhibitor of activated STAT protein gamma (PIASg or PIASy), and is an enzyme that in humans is encoded by the PIAS4 gene.

== Interactions ==
PIAS4 has been shown to interact with Mothers against decapentaplegic homolog 6, Mothers against decapentaplegic homolog 7 and Lymphoid enhancer-binding factor 1. PIAS4 has been shown to be responsible for the SUMOylation of inhibited Werner syndrome helicase (WRN) trapped on DNA in microsatellite unstable cancer cells.
