= Protein inhibitor of activated STAT2 =

Protein-coding gene in the species Homo sapiens

PIAS2

Identifiers
- Aliases: PIAS2, ARIP3, DIP, MIZ, MIZ1, PIASX, PIASX-ALPHA, PIASX-BETA, SIZ2, ZMIZ4, Protein inhibitor of activated STAT2, protein inhibitor of activated STAT 2
- External IDs: OMIM: 603567; MGI: 1096566; GeneCards: PIAS2
Available structures
PDB	Ortholog search: PDBe RCSB
PDB	List of PDB id codes 2ASQ, 4FO9

Gene location (Human)
Chr.	Chromosome 18 (human)
Band	18q21.1	Start	46,803,218 bp
Band	18q21.1	End	46,920,160 bp

Gene location (Mouse)
Chr.	Chromosome 18 (mouse)
Band	18|18 E3	Start	77,152,904 bp
Band	18|18 E3	End	77,241,496 bp
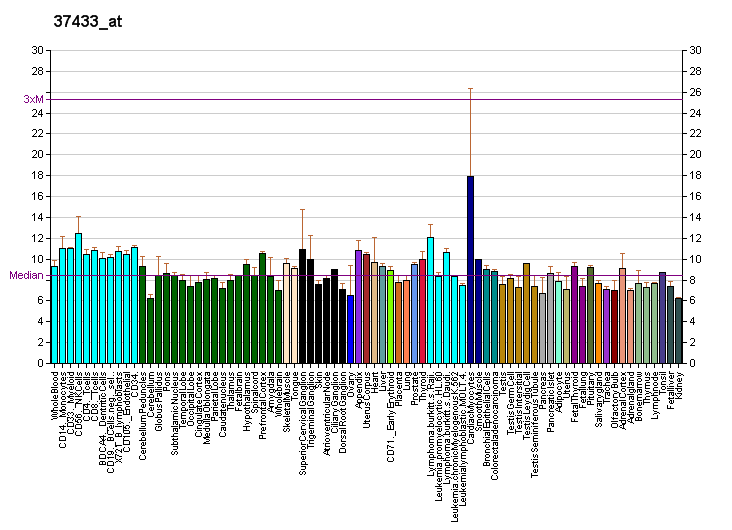

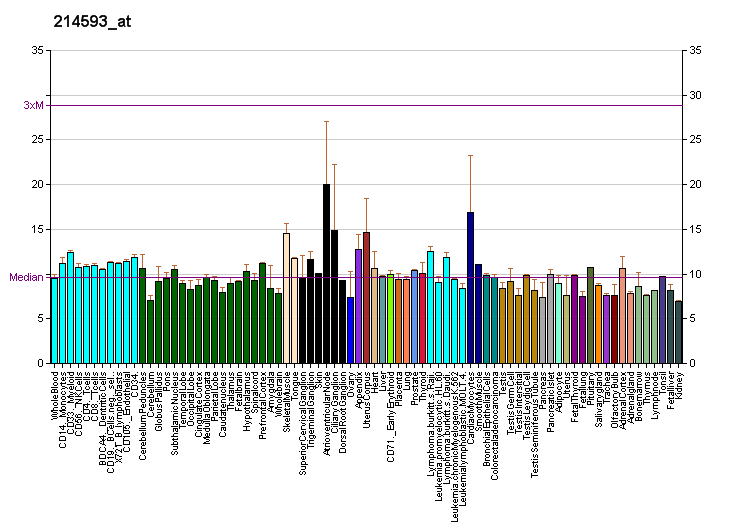

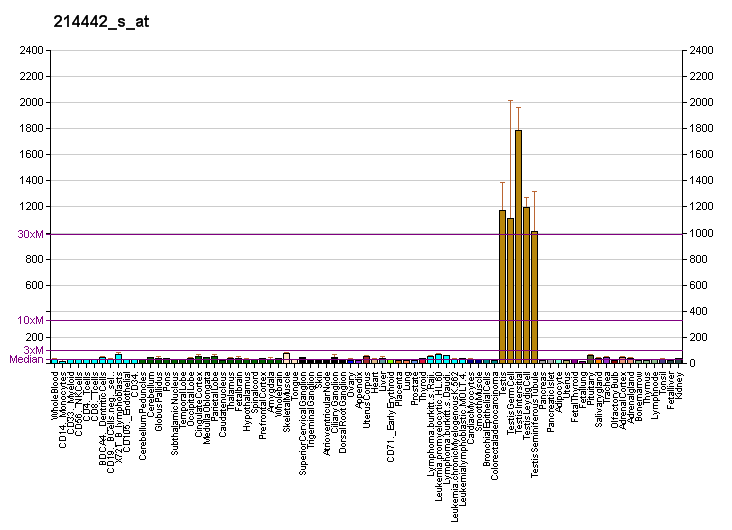
RNA expression pattern
Bgee	Human / Mouse (ortholog); Top expressed in: sperm; left testis; right testis; epithelium of colon; secondary oocyte; testicle; gastrocnemius muscle; buccal mucosa cell; cerebellar vermis; internal globus pallidus / Top expressed in: seminiferous tubule; spermatid; spermatocyte; ventricular zone; Gonadal ridge; ganglionic eminence; lens; tail of embryo; neural layer of retina; medial ganglionic eminence; More reference expression data
BioGPS	More reference expression data
Gene ontology
Molecular function	DNA binding; transcription coactivator activity; zinc ion binding; transcription factor binding; metal ion binding; SUMO ligase activity; ligase activity; protein binding; androgen receptor binding; ubiquitin protein ligase binding; SUMO transferase activity; transferase activity
Cellular component	PML body; nuclear speck; nuclear body; nucleoplasm; nucleus
Biological process	androgen receptor signaling pathway; regulation of transcription, DNA-templated; regulation of transcription by RNA polymerase II; negative regulation of androgen receptor signaling pathway; negative regulation of DNA-binding transcription factor activity; transcription, DNA-templated; positive regulation of transcription, DNA-templated; regulation of osteoblast differentiation; positive regulation of transcription by RNA polymerase II; protein sumoylation
Sources:Amigo / QuickGO
Orthologs
Databases	NCBI: entry; OMA: entry
Species	Human	Mouse
Entrez	9063	17344
Ensembl	ENSG00000078043	ENSMUSG00000025423
UniProt	O75928	Q8C5D8
RefSeq (mRNA)	NM_004671; NM_173206; NM_001324046; NM_001324047; NM_001324048 NM_001324049; NM_001324051; NM_001324052; NM_001324053; NM_001324054; NM_001324055; NM_001324057; NM_001324058; NM_001324059; NM_001324060; NM_001354033; NM_001354034; NM_001354035; NM_001354036; NM_001354037; NM_001354038; NM_001354039	NM_001164167; NM_001164168; NM_001164169; NM_001164170; NM_008602
RefSeq (protein)	NP_001310975; NP_001310976; NP_001310977; NP_001310978; NP_001310980 NP_001310981; NP_001310982; NP_001310983; NP_001310984; NP_001310986; NP_001310987; NP_001310988; NP_001310989; NP_004662; NP_775298; NP_001340962; NP_001340963; NP_001340964; NP_001340965; NP_001340966; NP_001340967; NP_001340968	NP_001157639; NP_001157640; NP_001157641; NP_001157642; NP_032628
Location (UCSC)	Chr 18: 46.8 – 46.92 Mb	Chr 18: 77.15 – 77.24 Mb
PubMed search
- Wikidata
View/Edit Human	View/Edit Mouse

E3 SUMO-protein ligase PIAS2 is an enzyme that in humans is encoded by the PIAS2 gene.

== Interactions ==
Protein inhibitor of activated STAT2 has been shown to interact with:

- Androgen receptor,
- DNMT3A,
- PARK7, and
- UBE2I.
