= PIAS1 =

Protein-coding gene in the species Homo sapiens

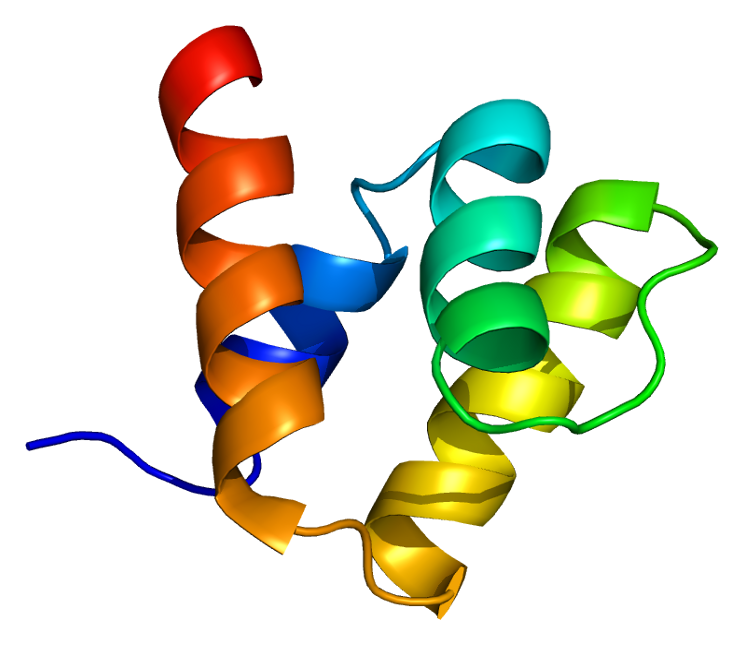

Identifiers
- Aliases: PIAS1, DDXBP1, GBP, GU/RH-II, ZMIZ3, protein inhibitor of activated STAT 1
- External IDs: OMIM: 603566; MGI: 1913125; GeneCards: PIAS1
Available structures
PDB	Ortholog search: PDBe RCSB
PDB	List of PDB id codes 1V66

Gene location (Human)
Chr.	Chromosome 15 (human)
Band	15q23	Start	68,054,309 bp
Band	15q23	End	68,198,603 bp

Gene location (Mouse)
Chr.	Chromosome 9 (mouse)
Band	9|9 B	Start	62,785,650 bp
Band	9|9 B	End	62,895,206 bp
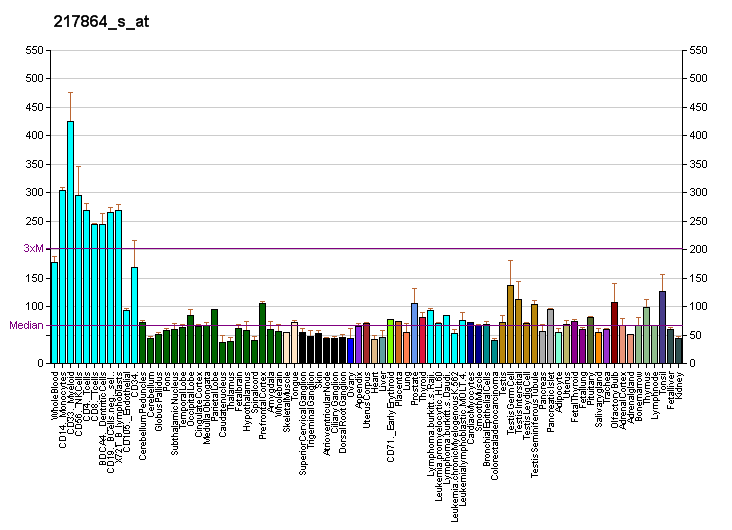
RNA expression pattern
Bgee	Human / Mouse (ortholog); Top expressed in: secondary oocyte; seminal vesicula; nipple; caput epididymis; tail of epididymis; bone marrow cell; cardia; trabecular bone; Achilles tendon; buccal mucosa cell / Top expressed in: zygote; spermatid; secondary oocyte; primary oocyte; seminiferous tubule; pineal gland; genital tubercle; spermatocyte; olfactory tubercle; granulocyte; More reference expression data
BioGPS	More reference expression data
Gene ontology
Molecular function	DNA binding; transcription corepressor activity; transcription coactivator activity; zinc ion binding; transcription factor binding; metal ion binding; SUMO ligase activity; protein binding; androgen receptor binding; enzyme binding; ubiquitin protein ligase binding; protein domain specific binding; SUMO transferase activity; transferase activity; protein C-terminus binding
Cellular component	PML body; nuclear speck; nucleoplasm; nucleus
Biological process	androgen receptor signaling pathway; receptor signaling pathway via JAK-STAT; regulation of transcription, DNA-templated; negative regulation of transcription by RNA polymerase II; protein sumoylation; transcription, DNA-templated; regulation of interferon-gamma-mediated signaling pathway; regulation of cell population proliferation; fat cell differentiation; positive regulation of proteasomal ubiquitin-dependent protein catabolic process; visual learning; negative regulation of apoptotic process; positive regulation of smooth muscle cell differentiation; spermatogenesis; positive regulation of protein sumoylation; protein-DNA complex assembly; positive regulation of transcription, DNA-templated; G1/S transition of mitotic cell cycle
Sources:Amigo / QuickGO
Orthologs
Databases	NCBI: entry; OMA: entry
Species	Human	Mouse
Entrez	8554	56469
Ensembl	ENSG00000033800	ENSMUSG00000032405
UniProt	O75925	O88907
RefSeq (mRNA)	NM_016166; NM_001320687	NM_019663
RefSeq (protein)	NP_001307616; NP_057250	NP_062637
Location (UCSC)	Chr 15: 68.05 – 68.2 Mb	Chr 9: 62.79 – 62.9 Mb
PubMed search
- Wikidata
View/Edit Human	View/Edit Mouse

E3 SUMO-protein ligase PIAS1 is an enzyme that in humans is encoded by the PIAS1 gene.

== Function ==
This gene encodes a member of the mammalian PIAS [protein inhibitor of activated STAT-1 (signal transducer and activator of transcription-1)] family. This member contains a putative zinc-binding motif and a highly acidic region. It inhibits STAT1-mediated gene activation and the DNA binding activity, binds to Gu protein/RNA helicase II/DEAD box polypeptide 21, and interacts with androgen receptor (AR). It functions in testis as a nuclear receptor transcriptional coregulator and may have a role in AR initiation and maintenance of spermatogenesis.

== Interactions ==
PIAS1 has been shown to interact with:

- DNMT3A,
- P53,
- STAT1,
- Small ubiquitin-related modifier 1,
- Sp3 transcription factor, and
- UBE2I.
