= SUMO enzymes =

SUMO enzymatic cascade

SUMO enzymatic cascade catalyzes the dynamic posttranslational modification process of sumoylation (i.e. transfer of SUMO protein to other proteins). The Small Ubiquitin-related Modifier, SUMO-1, is a ubiquitin-like family member that is conjugated to its substrates through three discrete enzymatic steps (see the figure on the right): activation, involving the E1 enzyme (SAE1/SAE2); conjugation, involving the E2 enzyme (UBE2I); substrate modification, through the cooperation of the E2 and E3 protein ligases.

SUMO pathway modifies hundreds of proteins that participate in diverse cellular processes. SUMO pathway is the most studied ubiquitin-like pathway that regulates a wide range of cellular events, evidenced by a large number of sumoylated proteins identified in more than ten large-scale studies.

== See also ==
- Metabolism
- Metabolic network
- Metabolic network modelling
