= RANBP2 =

Protein-coding gene in the species Homo sapiens

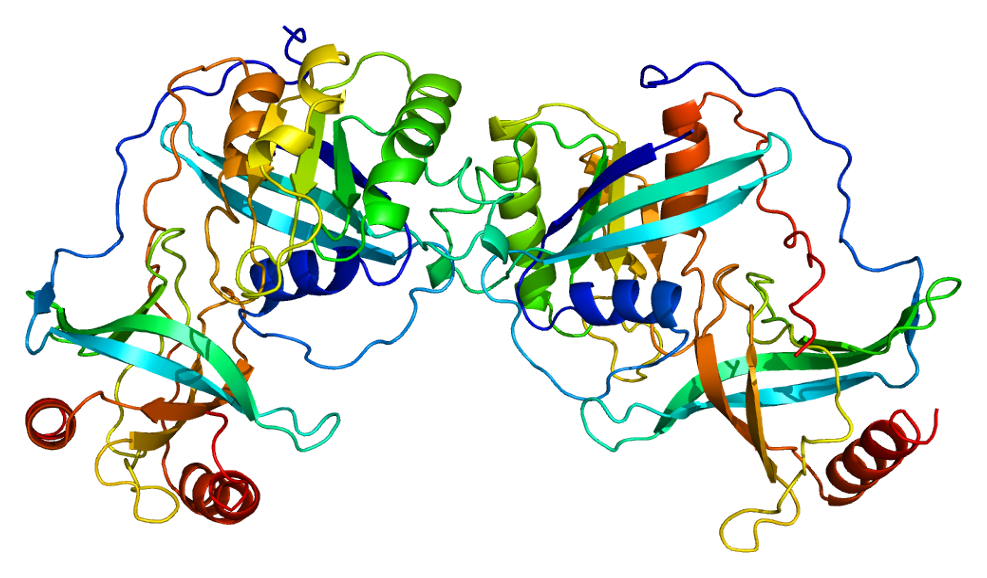

Identifiers
- Aliases: RANBP2, ADANE, ANE1, IIAE3, NUP358, TRP1, TRP2, RAN binding protein 2
- External IDs: OMIM: 601181; MGI: 894323; GeneCards: RANBP2
Available structures
PDB	Ortholog search: PDBe RCSB
PDB	List of PDB id codes 1RRP, 1XKE, 1Z5S, 3UIN, 3UIO, 3UIP, 4I9Y, 4L6E, 4LQW, 5CLL, 5CLQ, 2LAS

Gene location (Human)
Chr.	Chromosome 2 (human)
Band	2q13	Start	108,719,482 bp
Band	2q13	End	108,785,809 bp

Gene location (Mouse)
Chr.	Chromosome 10 (mouse)
Band	10 B4|10 29.34 cM	Start	58,282,742 bp
Band	10 B4|10 29.34 cM	End	58,330,178 bp
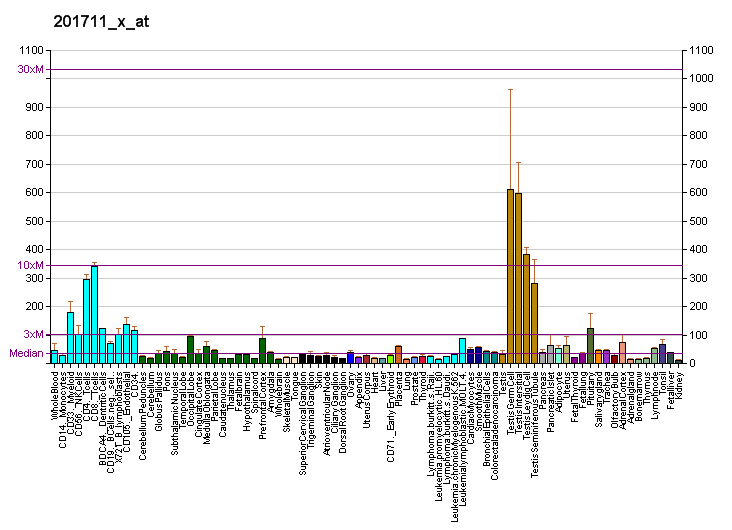

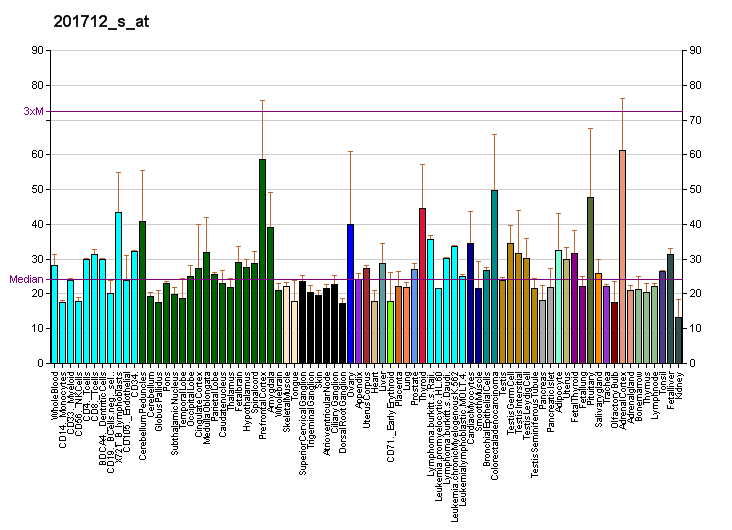

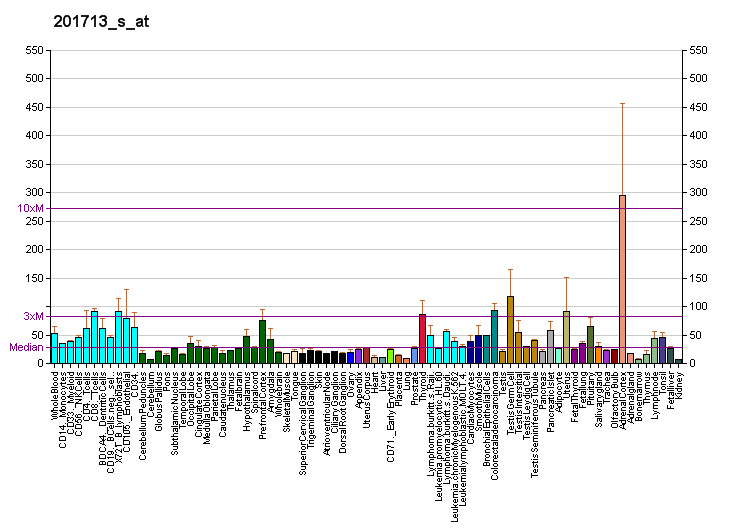
RNA expression pattern
Bgee	Human / Mouse (ortholog); Top expressed in: endothelial cell; sperm; mucosa of paranasal sinus; Skeletal muscle tissue of rectus abdominis; epithelium of nasopharynx; tibia; visceral pleura; superficial temporal artery; seminal vesicula; germinal epithelium / Top expressed in: human fetus; Gonadal ridge; lobe of cerebellum; lacrimal gland; cerebellar vermis; spermatocyte; spermatid; left lung lobe; primitive streak; pineal gland; More reference expression data
BioGPS	More reference expression data
Gene ontology
Molecular function	peptidyl-prolyl cis-trans isomerase activity; metal ion binding; ligase activity; protein binding; RNA binding; SUMO transferase activity; GTPase activator activity; protein-containing complex binding; cyclosporin A binding; transferase activity
Cellular component	cytosol; nuclear membrane; membrane; nuclear pore; nuclear inclusion body; nuclear pore nuclear basket; nucleus; nuclear envelope; lamellae anulatae; intracellular membrane-bounded organelle; cytoplasm; centrosome; mitochondrion; nuclear pore cytoplasmic filaments; cytoplasmic periphery of the nuclear pore complex; host cell
Biological process	mRNA transport; viral transcription; intracellular transport; protein sumoylation; protein peptidyl-prolyl isomerization; mitotic nuclear membrane disassembly; protein folding; regulation of cellular response to heat; protein transport; viral process; NLS-bearing protein import into nucleus; intracellular transport of virus; mRNA export from nucleus; tRNA export from nucleus; sister chromatid cohesion; centrosome localization; G1 phase; RNA export from nucleus; ubiquitin-dependent protein catabolic process; spindle organization; positive regulation of GTPase activity; positive regulation of mitotic centrosome separation; response to amphetamine; positive regulation of glucokinase activity; regulation of gene silencing by miRNA; regulation of glycolytic process; transport; regulation of gluconeogenesis
Sources:Amigo / QuickGO
Orthologs
Databases	NCBI: entry; OMA: entry
Species	Human	Mouse
Entrez	5903	19386
Ensembl	ENSG00000153201	ENSMUSG00000003226
UniProt	P49792	Q9ERU9
RefSeq (mRNA)	NM_006267	NM_011240
RefSeq (protein)	NP_006258	NP_035370
Location (UCSC)	Chr 2: 108.72 – 108.79 Mb	Chr 10: 58.28 – 58.33 Mb
PubMed search
- Wikidata
View/Edit Human	View/Edit Mouse

RAN binding protein 2 (RANBP2) is protein which in humans is encoded by the RANBP2 gene. It is also known as nucleoporin 358 (Nup358) since it is a member nucleoporin family that makes up the nuclear pore complex. RanBP2 has a mass of 358 kDa.

== Function ==
RAN is a small GTP-binding protein of the RAS superfamily. Ran GTPase is a master regulatory switch, which among other functions, controls the shuttling of proteins between the nuclear and cytoplasm compartments of the cell. Ran GTPase controls a variety of cellular functions through its interactions with other proteins. The RanBP2 gene encodes a very large RAN-binding protein that localizes to cytoplasmic filaments emanating from the nuclear pore complex. RanBP2/Nup358 is a giant scaffold and mosaic cyclophilin-related nucleoporin implicated in controlling selective processes of the Ran-GTPase cycle. RanBP2 is composed of multiple domains. Each domain of RanBP2 selectively and directly interacts with distinct proteins such as Ran GTPase, importin-beta, exportin-1/CRM1, red opsin, subunits of the proteasome, cox11 and the kinesin-1 isoforms, KIF5B and KIF5C. Another partner of RanBP2 is the E2 enzyme UBC9. RanBP2 strongly enhances SUMO1 transfer from UBC9 to the SUMO1 target SP100. Another target for SUMOylation is RanGAP which is the GTPase activating protein for Ran. SUMO-RanGAP interacts with a domain near the carboxyl terminus of RanBP2. These findings place sumoylation at the cytoplasmic filaments of the nuclear pore complex and suggest that, for some substrates, modification and nuclear import are linked events. The pleiotropic (multifunctional) role of RanBP2 reflects its interaction with multiple partners, each presenting distinct cellular or molecular functions. This gene is partially duplicated in a gene cluster that lies in a hot spot for recombination on human chromosome 2q.

== Clinical significance ==
Insufficiency of RanBP2 is directly linked to carcinogenesis, aneuploidy, and neuroprotection of photoreceptor neurons to light-elicited stress and aging. Human missense mutations in RanBP2 were identified in its leucine-rich domain and they cause autosomal dominant necrotizing encephalopathy (ADNE).

== Interactions ==
RANBP2 has been shown to interact with KPNB1 and UBE2I.
