= UBE2I =

Protein-coding gene in the species Homo sapiens

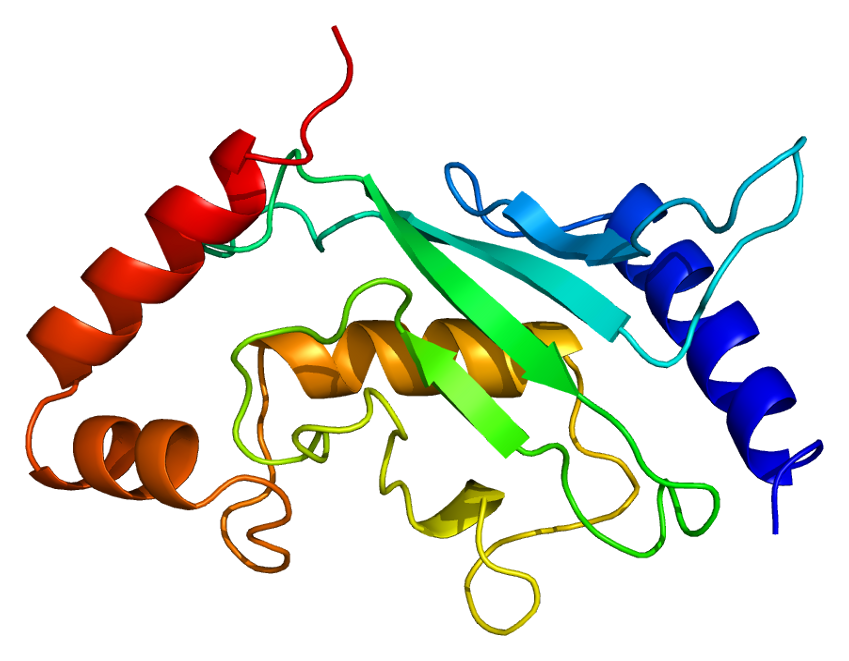

Identifiers
- Aliases: UBE2I, C358B7.1, P18, UBC9, ubiquitin conjugating enzyme E2 I
- External IDs: OMIM: 601661; MGI: 107365; GeneCards: UBE2I
Available structures
PDB	Ortholog search: PDBe RCSB
PDB	List of PDB id codes 1A3S, 1KPS, 1Z5S, 2GRN, 2GRO, 2GRP, 2GRQ, 2GRR, 2O25, 2PE6, 2PX9, 2XWU, 3A4S, 3UIN, 3UIO, 3UIP, 4Y1L, 4W5V, 2VRR, 5D2M, 5F6D, 5F6U, 5F6W, 5F6E, 5F6X, 5F6V, 5F6Y

Gene location (Human)
Chr.	Chromosome 16 (human)
Band	16p13.3	Start	1,308,880 bp
Band	16p13.3	End	1,327,018 bp

Gene location (Mouse)
Chr.	Chromosome 17 (mouse)
Band	17|17 A3.3	Start	25,480,890 bp
Band	17|17 A3.3	End	25,493,596 bp
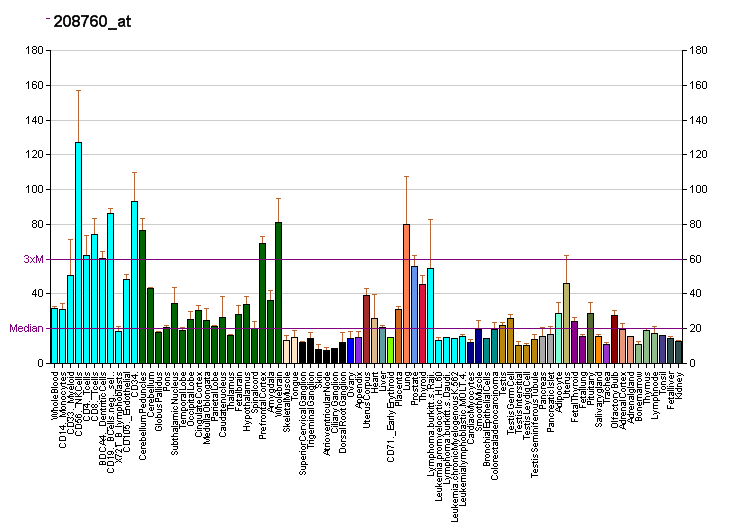

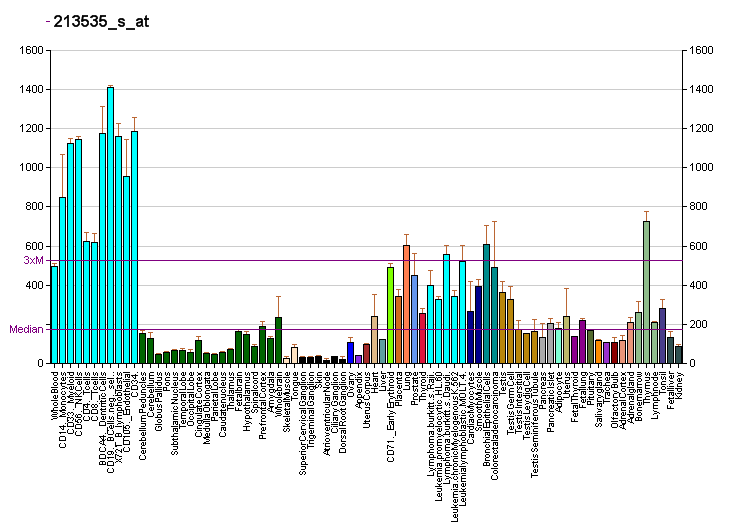

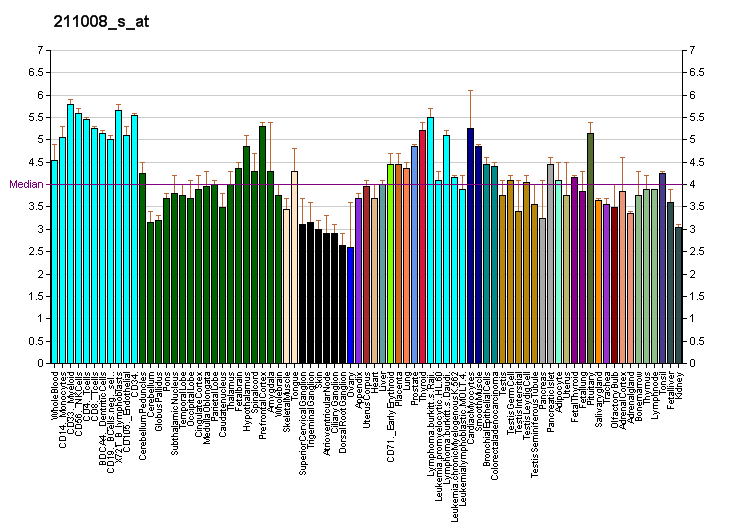
RNA expression pattern
Bgee	Human / Mouse (ortholog); Top expressed in: oocyte; ganglionic eminence; left ovary; ventricular zone; monocyte; right ovary; thymus; stromal cell of endometrium; left uterine tube; left adrenal gland / Top expressed in: zygote; tail of embryo; genital tubercle; ventricular zone; embryo; spermatid; spermatocyte; yolk sac; embryo; lip; More reference expression data
BioGPS	More reference expression data
Gene ontology
Molecular function	nucleotide binding; SUMO transferase activity; ubiquitin protein ligase activity; transcription factor binding; RING-like zinc finger domain binding; HLH domain binding; protein binding; enzyme binding; SUMO conjugating enzyme activity; ATP binding; ubiquitin protein ligase binding; transferase activity; RNA binding; small protein activating enzyme binding; ubiquitin-protein transferase activity; protein C-terminus binding; bHLH transcription factor binding
Cellular component	cytoplasm; PML body; nuclear body; nucleoplasm; transferase complex; synaptonemal complex; nucleus; cytosol; sumoylated E2 ligase complex; fibrillar center; nuclear envelope; dendrite; synapse
Biological process	ubiquitin-dependent protein catabolic process; chromosome segregation; protein sumoylation; cell division; global genome nucleotide-excision repair; positive regulation of I-kappaB kinase/NF-kappaB signaling; cell cycle; positive regulation of SUMO transferase activity; viral process; negative regulation of transcription, DNA-templated; negative regulation of transcription by RNA polymerase II; regulation of signaling receptor activity; protein ubiquitination; positive regulation of intracellular steroid hormone receptor signaling pathway; proteasome-mediated ubiquitin-dependent protein catabolic process; positive regulation of DNA-binding transcription factor activity
Sources:Amigo / QuickGO
Orthologs
Databases	NCBI: entry; OMA: entry
Species	Human	Mouse
Entrez	7329	22196
Ensembl	ENSG00000103275	ENSMUSG00000015120
UniProt	P63279	P63280
RefSeq (mRNA)	NM_003345; NM_194259; NM_194260; NM_194261	NM_001177609; NM_001177610; NM_011665; NM_001357694
RefSeq (protein)	NP_003336; NP_919235; NP_919236; NP_919237	NP_001171080; NP_001171081; NP_035795; NP_001344623
Location (UCSC)	Chr 16: 1.31 – 1.33 Mb	Chr 17: 25.48 – 25.49 Mb
PubMed search
- Wikidata
View/Edit Human	View/Edit Mouse

SUMO-conjugating enzyme UBC9 is an enzyme that in humans is encoded by the UBE2I gene. It is also sometimes referred to as "ubiquitin conjugating enzyme E2I" or "ubiquitin carrier protein 9", even though these names do not accurately describe its function.

== Expression ==
Four alternatively spliced transcript variants encoding the same protein have been found for this gene.

== Function ==
The UBC9 protein encoded by the UBE2I gene constitutes a core machinery in the cell's sumoylation pathway. Sumoylation is a process in which a Small Ubiquitin-like MOdifier (SUMO) is covalently attached to other proteins in order to modify their behaviour. For example, sumoylation may affect a protein's localization in the cell, its ability to interact with other proteins or DNA.

UBC9 performs the third step in the sumoylation life cycle: the conjugation step. When SUMO protein precursors are first expressed, they first undergo a maturation step in which the four C-terminal amino acids are removed, revealing a di-glycine motif. In a second step, an E1 activating complex binds to SUMO at its di-glycine and passes it on to the E2 protein Ubc9, where it forms a thioester bond with a cysteine residue within Ubc9's catalytic pocket. The loaded Ubc9 is now ready to perform the sumoylation of its various target proteins (also called substrates). It recognizes a particular motif of amino acid residues in these substrates: A large hydrophobic residue, followed by a lysine, followed by a spacer, followed by an acidic residue. This motif is usually described in shorthand as ΨKxD/E. The central lysine within the substrate's recognition motif is inserted into the catalytic pocket. There the carboxyl terminus of SUMO's di-glycine forms a peptide bond with the ε-amino group of the lysine. This process can be assisted by an E3 ligase protein.

The sumoylation process is reversible. SENP proteases can remove SUMO from sumoylated proteins, freeing it to be used in further sumoylation reactions.

== Clinical significance relevance ==
The protein UBC9 encoded by the UBE2I gene has been shown to be targeted by multiple viruses, including HIV and HPV. It has been hypothesized that these viruses hijack UBC9 to serve their own purposes.

== Interactions ==
UBE2I has been shown to interact with:

- ATF2,
- Androgen receptor,
- BLMH,
- DACH1,
- DNMT3A,
- DNMT3B,
- DAXX,
- ETS1,
- FHIT,
- IPO13,
- MAP3K1 and
- MITF,
- P53,
- PIAS1,
- PIAS2,
- RAD51,
- RANBP2,
- RANGAP1,
- SAE2,
- SALL1,
- SUMO1,
- TCF3,
- TNFRSF1A,
- TOP1, and
- WT1.
