= L29 =

L29 or L-29 may refer to:

- 60S ribosomal protein L29, a protein in humans
- Aero L-29 Delfín, a Czechoslovak military trainer aircraft introduced in 1961
- Cord L-29, an American automobile introduced in 1929
