= Subasumstat =

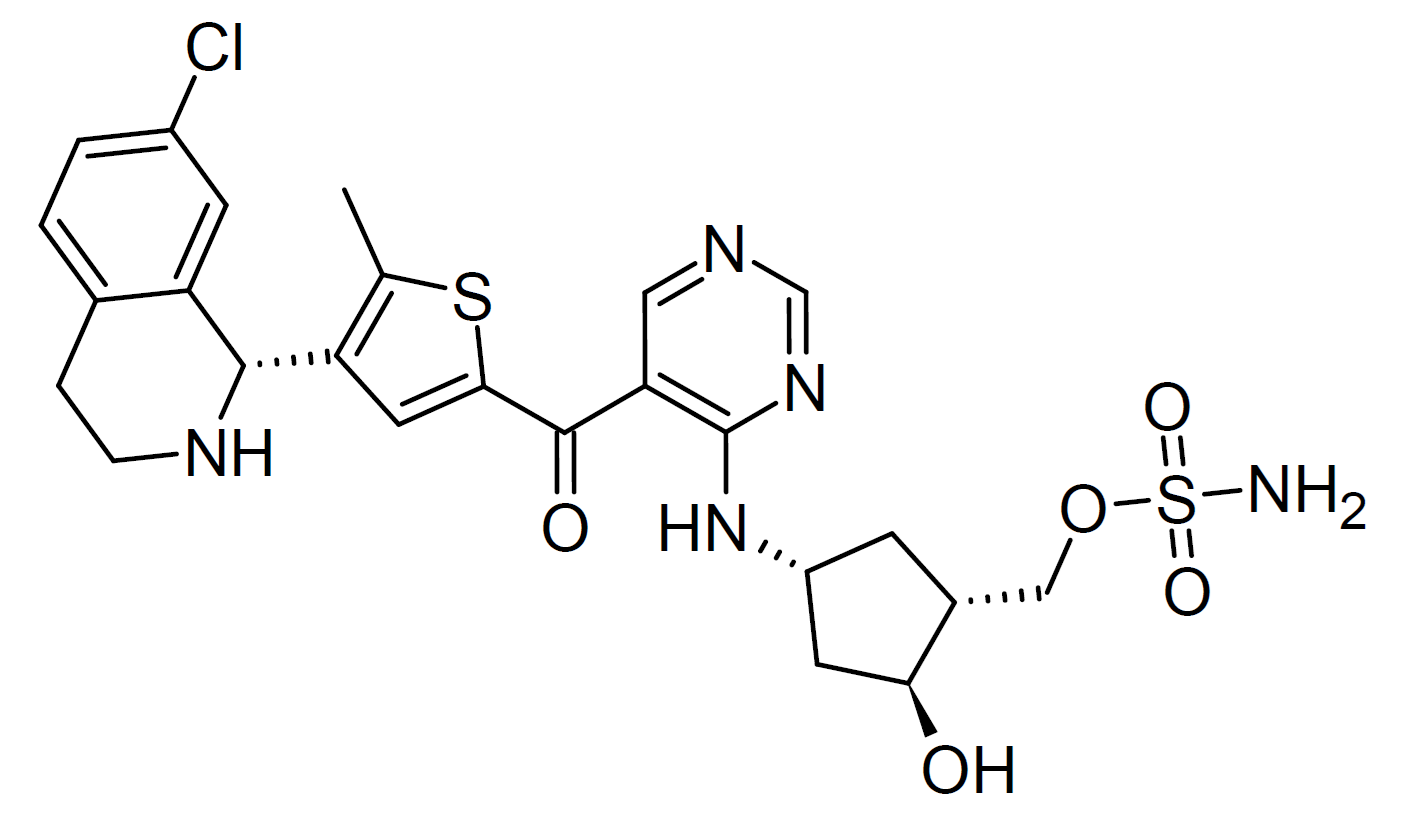

Clinical data
- Drug class: SUMOylation inhibitor

Identifiers
- IUPAC name: [(1R,2S,4R)-4-[[5-[4-[(1R)-7-chloro-1,2,3,4-tetrahydroisoquinolin-1-yl]-5-methylthiophene-2-carbonyl]pyrimidin-4-yl]amino]-2-hydroxycyclopentyl]methyl sulfamate
- CAS Number: 1858276-04-6
- PubChem CID: 118628567
- IUPHAR/BPS: 11305
- DrugBank: DB16406
- ChemSpider: 72380106
- UNII: XQ43H3V6M1
- KEGG: D12268
- ChEMBL: ChEMBL4862901

Chemical and physical data
- Formula: C_{25}H_{28}ClN_{5}O_{5}S
- Molar mass: 546.04 g·mol^{−1}
- 3D model (JSmol): Interactive image
- SMILES: CC1=C(C=C(S1)C(=O)C2=CN=CN=C2N[C@@H]3C[C@@H]([C@H](C3)O)COS(=O)(=O)N)[C@H]4C5=C(CCN4)C=CC(=C5)Cl
- InChI: InChI=1S/C25H28ClN5O5S2/c1-13-18(23-19-7-16(26)3-2-14(19)4-5-29-23)9-22(37-13)24(33)20-10-28-12-30-25(20)31-17-6-15(21(32)8-17)11-36-38(27,34)35/h2-3,7,9-10,12,15,17,21,23,29,32H,4-6,8,11H2,1H3,(H2,27,34,35)(H,28,30,31)/t15-,17-,21+,23+/m1/s1; Key:LXRZVMYMQHNYJB-UNXOBOICSA-N

Subasumstat (TAK-981) is a drug that acts as a SUMOylation inhibitor. By preventing cellular proteins from being stabilised by conjugation with SUMO proteins, it makes it more difficult for cancer cells to maintain genomic stability during repeated cell divisions. It has been researched for the treatment of leukemia, as well as other forms of cancer.
