= SENP6 =

Protein-coding gene in the species Homo sapiens

Identifiers
- Aliases: SENP6, SSP1, SUSP1, SUMO1/sentrin specific peptidase 6, SUMO specific peptidase 6
- External IDs: OMIM: 605003; MGI: 1922075; GeneCards: SENP6

Gene location (Human)
Chr.	Chromosome 6 (human)
Band	6q14.1	Start	75,601,509 bp
Band	6q14.1	End	75,718,281 bp

Gene location (Mouse)
Chr.	Chromosome 9 (mouse)
Band	9|9 E1	Start	80,066,903 bp
Band	9|9 E1	End	80,144,953 bp
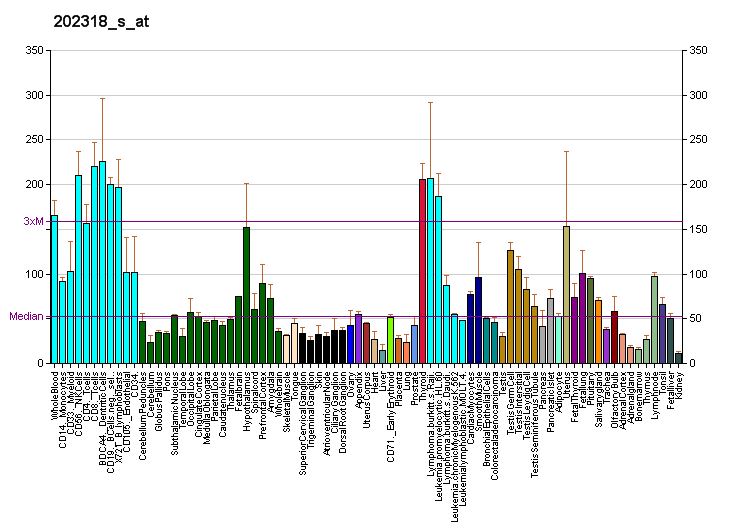

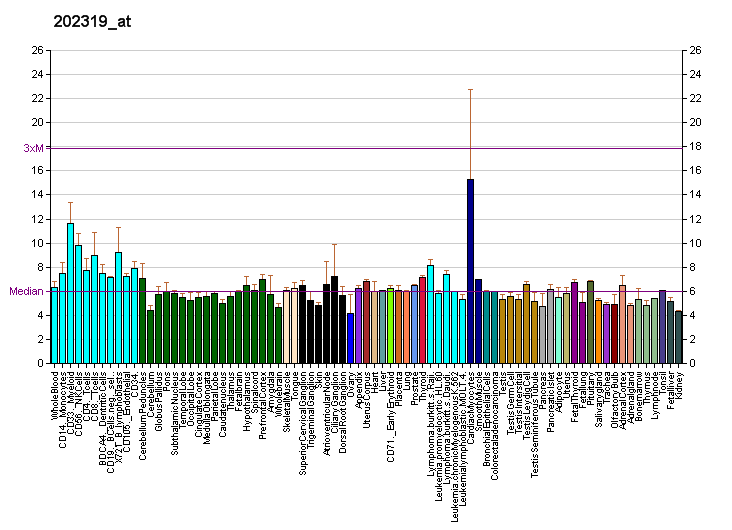
RNA expression pattern
Bgee	Human / Mouse (ortholog); Top expressed in: Achilles tendon; ventricular zone; gastric mucosa; right uterine tube; sural nerve; left ovary; ganglionic eminence; right ovary; body of uterus; left lobe of thyroid gland / Top expressed in: genital tubercle; tail of embryo; ventricular zone; zygote; granulocyte; ganglionic eminence; gastric mucosa; left lung lobe; mucous cell of stomach; epithelium of stomach; More reference expression data
BioGPS	More reference expression data
Gene ontology
Molecular function	peptidase activity; cysteine-type peptidase activity; protein binding; hydrolase activity; SUMO-specific endopeptidase activity
Cellular component	nucleus; nucleoplasm; cytosol; cytoplasm
Biological process	protein desumoylation; protein modification by small protein removal; regulation of spindle assembly; protein sumoylation; proteolysis; regulation of kinetochore assembly
Sources:Amigo / QuickGO
Orthologs
Databases	NCBI: entry; OMA: entry
Species	Human	Mouse
Entrez	26054	215351
Ensembl	ENSG00000112701	ENSMUSG00000034252
UniProt	Q9GZR1	Q6P7W0
RefSeq (mRNA)	NM_001100409; NM_001304792; NM_015571	NM_146003; NM_001311110
RefSeq (protein)	NP_001093879; NP_001291721; NP_056386	NP_001298039; NP_666115
Location (UCSC)	Chr 6: 75.6 – 75.72 Mb	Chr 9: 80.07 – 80.14 Mb
PubMed search
- Wikidata
View/Edit Human	View/Edit Mouse

Sentrin-specific protease 6 is an enzyme that in humans is encoded by the SENP6 gene.

== Function ==
Ubiquitin-like molecules (UBLs), such as SUMO1, are structurally related to ubiquitin and can be ligated to target proteins in a similar manner as ubiquitin. However, covalent attachment of UBLs does not result in degradation of the modified proteins. SUMO1 modification is implicated in the targeting of RANGAP1 to the nuclear pore complex, as well as in stabilization of I-kappa-B-alpha (NFKBIA; MIM 164008) from degradation by the 26S proteasome. Like ubiquitin, UBLs are synthesized as precursor proteins, with 1 or more amino acids following the C-terminal glycine-glycine residues of the mature UBL protein. Thus, the tail sequences of the UBL precursors need to be removed by UBL-specific proteases, such as SENP6, prior to their conjugation to target proteins

== See also ==
- small ubiquitin-related modifier 1
