= RanGAP =

RanGAP is a protein involved in the transport of other proteins from the cytosol to the nucleus in eukaryotic cells.

In model species such as the yeast Saccharomyces cerevisiae, the primate Homo sapiens (See RANGAP1) and the plant Arabidopsis thaliana, it acts as a GTPase-activating protein, catalysing the conversion of cytosolically-bound RanGTP to RanGDP. It has the opposite function of the RCC1, a nuclear-located protein that converts RanGDP to RanGTP. Together, RanGAP and RCC1 maintain what is known as the ran gradient, where RanGDP is in higher concentrations in the cytosol, while RanGTP is in higher concentrations in the nucleus. It is this ran gradient which provides the energy necessary for the transport of proteins into and out of the nucleus by karyopherin proteins.

== Location in cell ==
In mammalian and plant cells, RanGAP is located at the nuclear envelope during interphase. Animal RanGAP is bound to the nuclear pore component RANBP2 (Nup358). Plant RanGAP proteins do not contain the protein domain necessary for association with Nup358 but are targeted to the nuclear rim by the plant-specific WPP domain. In contrast to plant and animal cells, yeast RanGAP is located in the cytosol.

== RanGAP and the origin of eukaryotes ==
Together with RCC1 and components of the nuclear pore, RanGAP has been suggested to have evolved at the origin of eukaryotes.
