= 60S ribosomal protein L11 =

Protein found in humans

RPL11

Identifiers
- Aliases: RPL11, DBA7, GIG34, L11, ribosomal protein L11, uL5
- External IDs: OMIM: 604175; MGI: 1914275; GeneCards: RPL11
Available structures
PDB	Ortholog search: PDBe RCSB
PDB	List of PDB id codes 4UG0, 4V6X, 4XXB, 5AJ0, 4V5Z, 4UJD, 4D67, 4D5Y, 4UJE, 4UJC,%%s4UJE, 4XXB, 4UJD, 4D67, 4V5Z, 4V6X, 5AJ0, 4UJC, 4D5Y, 4UG0

Gene location (Human)
Chr.	Chromosome 1 (human)
Band	1p36.11	Start	23,691,742 bp
Band	1p36.11	End	23,696,835 bp

Gene location (Mouse)
Chr.	Chromosome 4 (mouse)
Band	4|4 D3	Start	135,755,576 bp
Band	4|4 D3	End	135,780,739 bp
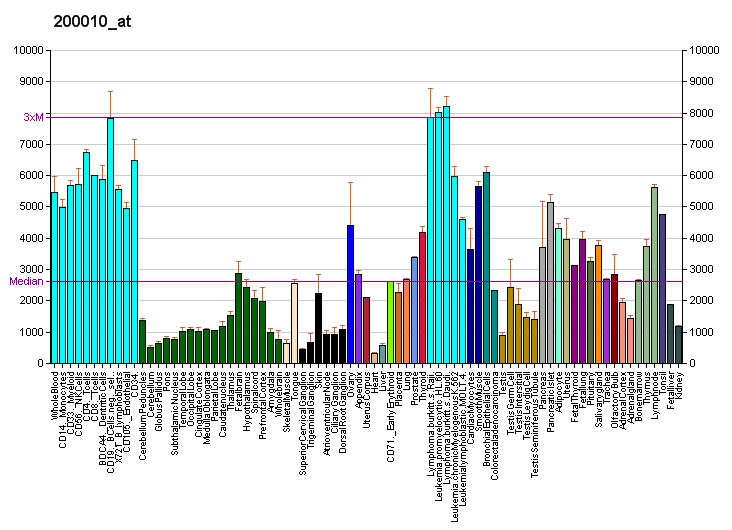
RNA expression pattern
Bgee	Human / Mouse (ortholog); Top expressed in: ganglionic eminence; monocyte; ventricular zone; granulocyte; left ovary; skin of hip; right ovary; right lung; body of stomach; lymph node / Top expressed in: yolk sac; embryo; embryo; lip; tail of embryo; genital tubercle; ventricular zone; dentate gyrus of hippocampal formation granule cell; morula; blastocyst; More reference expression data
BioGPS	More reference expression data
Gene ontology
Molecular function	rRNA binding; protein binding; RNA binding; structural constituent of ribosome; 5S rRNA binding; ubiquitin protein ligase binding; ubiquitin ligase inhibitor activity
Cellular component	cytosol; ribosome; membrane; intracellular anatomical structure; nucleolus; cytosolic large ribosomal subunit; extracellular exosome; nucleus; extracellular matrix; nucleoplasm; cytoplasm; protein-containing complex; polysomal ribosome
Biological process	protein targeting; viral transcription; SRP-dependent cotranslational protein targeting to membrane; ribosomal large subunit biogenesis; translational initiation; nuclear-transcribed mRNA catabolic process, nonsense-mediated decay; rRNA processing; protein biosynthesis; ribosomal large subunit assembly; positive regulation of gene expression; positive regulation of protein binding; protein stabilization; negative regulation of ubiquitin protein ligase activity; negative regulation of ubiquitin-dependent protein catabolic process; negative regulation of protein neddylation; regulation of signal transduction by p53 class mediator; negative regulation of proteasomal ubiquitin-dependent protein catabolic process; protein localization to nucleus; positive regulation of signal transduction by p53 class mediator; positive regulation of intrinsic apoptotic signaling pathway by p53 class mediator; cytoplasmic translation
Sources:Amigo / QuickGO
Orthologs
Databases	NCBI: entry; OMA: entry
Species	Human	Mouse
Entrez	6135	67025
Ensembl	ENSG00000142676	ENSMUSG00000059291
UniProt	P62913; Q5VVD0	Q9CXW4
RefSeq (mRNA)	NM_001199802; NM_000975	NM_025919
RefSeq (protein)	NP_000966; NP_001186731; NP_000966.2	NP_080195
Location (UCSC)	Chr 1: 23.69 – 23.7 Mb	Chr 4: 135.76 – 135.78 Mb
PubMed search
- Wikidata
View/Edit Human	View/Edit Mouse

60S ribosomal protein L11 is a protein that in humans is encoded by the RPL11 gene.

== Function ==
Ribosomes, the organelles that catalyze protein synthesis, consist of a small 40S subunit and a large 60S subunit. Together these subunits are composed of 4 RNA species and approximately 80 structurally distinct proteins. This gene encodes a ribosomal protein that is a component of the 60S subunit. The protein belongs to the L5P family of ribosomal proteins. It is located in the cytoplasm. The protein probably associates with the 5S rRNA. Alternative splice variants encoding different isoforms may exist, but they have not been fully characterized. As is typical for genes encoding ribosomal proteins, there are multiple processed pseudogenes of this gene dispersed through the genome.

== Interactions ==
RPL11 has been shown to interact with:

- BLMH,
- Mdm2,
- NOP53,
- P16,
- P53, and
- Promyelocytic leukemia protein
