= SENP1 =

Protein-coding gene in humans

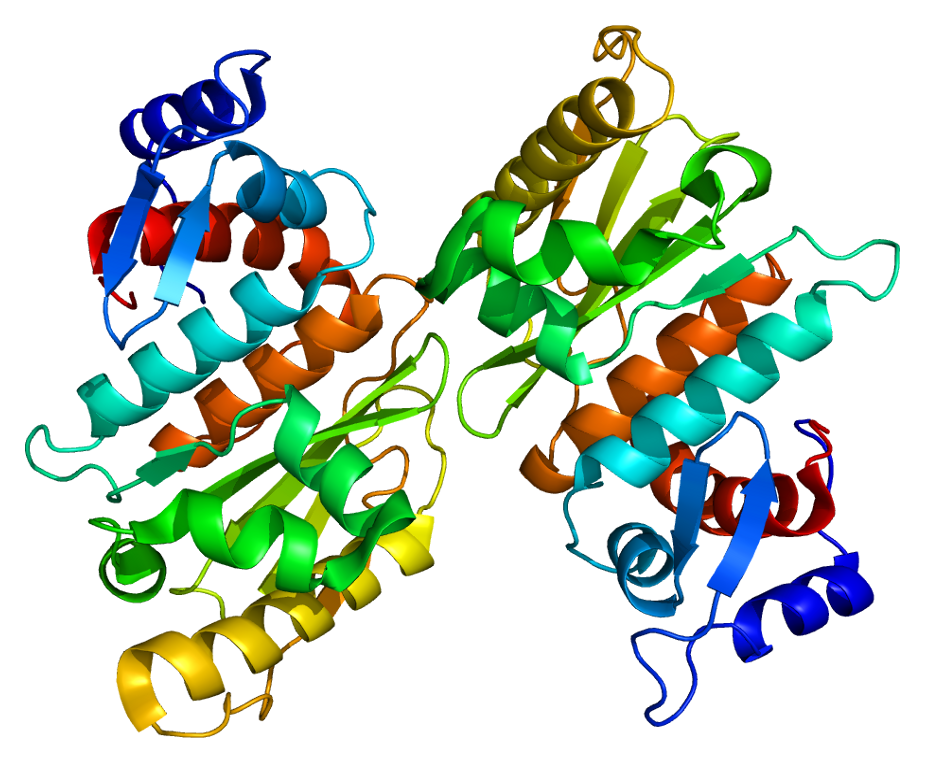

Identifiers
- Aliases: SENP1, SuPr-2, SUMO1/sentrin specific peptidase 1, SUMO specific peptidase 1
- External IDs: OMIM: 612157; MGI: 2445054; GeneCards: SENP1
Available structures
PDB	Ortholog search: PDBe RCSB
PDB	List of PDB id codes 2CKG, 2CKH, 2G4D, 2IY0, 2IY1, 2IYC, 2IYD, 2XPH, 2XRE

Gene location (Human)
Chr.	Chromosome 12 (human)
Band	12q13.11	Start	48,042,897 bp
Band	12q13.11	End	48,106,079 bp

Gene location (Mouse)
Chr.	Chromosome 15 (mouse)
Band	15 F1|15 54.04 cM	Start	97,936,625 bp
Band	15 F1|15 54.04 cM	End	97,991,625 bp
RNA expression pattern
Bgee	Human / Mouse (ortholog); Top expressed in: testicle; right testis; left testis; testicle; sperm; buccal mucosa cell; Achilles tendon; ventricular zone; bone marrow cell; ganglionic eminence / Top expressed in: zygote; secondary oocyte; spermatocyte; spermatid; tail of embryo; ascending aorta; genital tubercle; aortic valve; Rostral migratory stream; epiblast; More reference expression data
BioGPS	n/a
Gene ontology
Molecular function	peptidase activity; cysteine-type peptidase activity; endopeptidase activity; protein binding; hydrolase activity; SUMO-specific endopeptidase activity; SUMO-specific protease activity
Cellular component	cytoplasm; nuclear membrane; focal adhesion; nucleoplasm; nucleus
Biological process	negative regulation of proteasomal ubiquitin-dependent protein catabolic process; apoptotic signaling pathway; protein desumoylation; activation of cysteine-type endopeptidase activity involved in apoptotic process; protein sumoylation; positive regulation of transcription by RNA polymerase II; proteolysis; regulation of definitive erythrocyte differentiation
Sources:Amigo / QuickGO
Orthologs
Databases	NCBI: entry; OMA: entry
Species	Human	Mouse
Entrez	29843	223870
Ensembl	ENSG00000079387	ENSMUSG00000033075
UniProt	Q9P0U3	P59110
RefSeq (mRNA)	NM_001267594; NM_001267595; NM_014554	NM_144851; NM_001379573
RefSeq (protein)	NP_001254523; NP_001254524	NP_659100; NP_001366502
Location (UCSC)	Chr 12: 48.04 – 48.11 Mb	Chr 15: 97.94 – 97.99 Mb
PubMed search
- Wikidata
View/Edit Human	View/Edit Mouse

Sentrin-specific protease 1 is an enzyme that in humans is encoded by the SENP1 gene.

== General ==
There are six known SUMO proteases in humans that have been designated SENP1-3 and SENP5-7 (sentrin/SUMO-specific protease). The six proteases possess a conserved C-terminal domain which are variable in size, and with a distinct N-terminal domain between them. The C-terminal domain shows catalytic activity and the N-terminal domain regulates cell localization and substrate specificity.

== Features ==
SENP1 (Sentrin-specific protease 1) is a human protease of 643 amino acids with a molecular weight of 73 kDa, EC number in humans 3.4.22.B70. It adopts a conformation that identifies it as a member of the superfamily of cysteine proteases, which contain a catalytic triad with three characterized amino acids: a cysteine at position 603, a histidine at position 533 and aspartic acid at position 550. The primary nucleophile is cysteine located at the N-terminal alpha helix of the protein core. The other two amino acids, aspartate and histidine, are located in the end of a beta sheet.

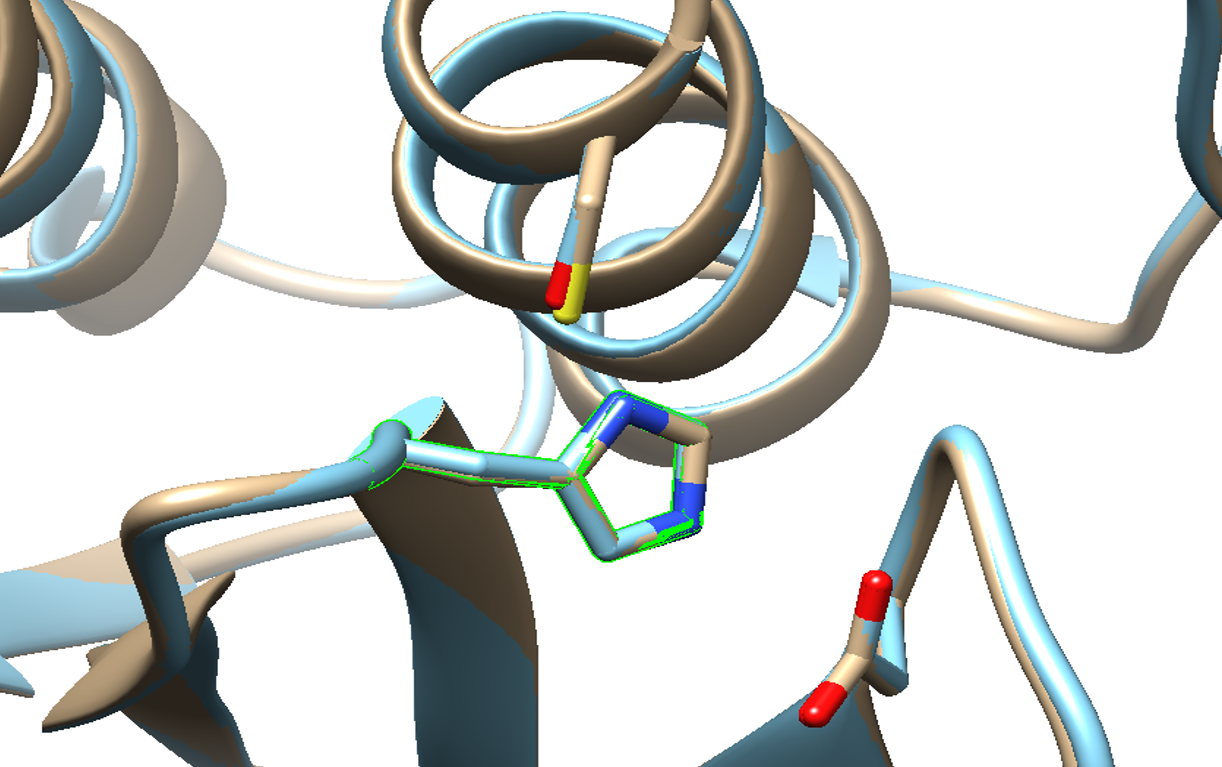
SENP1 The catalytic site consists of three amino acids: Cys 602, His 533 and Asp 550.

== Location ==
Both SENP1 are located in the nucleus and cytosol depending on the cell type, although it has been seen to be exported out from the nucleus to the cytosol through a sequence of nuclear export (NES) that is located at the C-terminus. The mammalian SENP1 is localized mainly in the nucleus.

== Function ==
SENP1 catalyzes maturation of SUMO protein (small ubiquitin-related modifier). SENP1 causes hydrolysis of a peptide bond of SUMO in the conserved sequence Gly-Gly-|-Ala-Thr-Tyr at the C-terminus, which can then be conjugated to other proteins (sumoylation). In vertebrates there are three members of the family of SUMO: SUMO-1, -2 and -3. SENP1 can catalyze the maturation of any of these three. This conjugation of SUMO toward other proteins is similar to ubiquitination, however these modifications can lead to different outcomes depending on the type of protein being modified.
