= Bleomycin hydrolase =

Protein-coding gene in the species Homo sapiens

BLMH
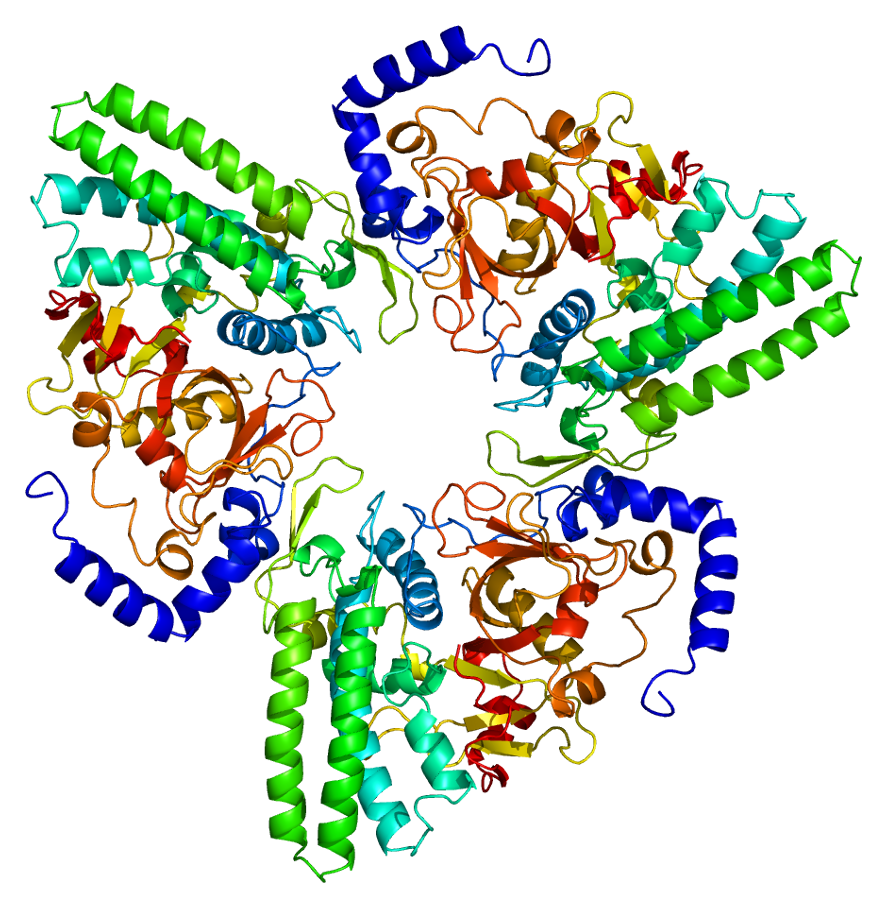

Identifiers
- Aliases: BLMH, BH, BMH, bleomycin hydrolase
- External IDs: OMIM: 602403; MGI: 1345186; GeneCards: BLMH
Available structures
PDB	Ortholog search: PDBe RCSB
PDB	List of PDB id codes 1CB5, 2CB5
Enzyme activity
EC #	BRENDA	ExPASy	KEGG	MetaCyc
3.4.22.40	↗	↗	↗	↗

Gene location (Human)
Chr.	Chromosome 17 (human)
Band	17q11.2	Start	30,248,203 bp
Band	17q11.2	End	30,292,056 bp

Gene location (Mouse)
Chr.	Chromosome 11 (mouse)
Band	11|11 B5	Start	76,815,635 bp
Band	11|11 B5	End	76,878,205 bp
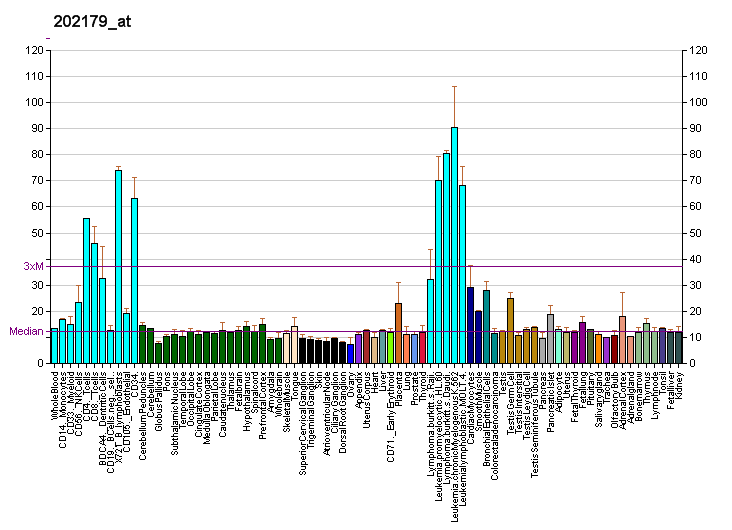
RNA expression pattern
Bgee	Human / Mouse (ortholog); Top expressed in: skin of arm; skin of leg; skin of abdomen; skin of thigh; epithelium of colon; body of pancreas; Descending thoracic aorta; mucosa of esophagus; stromal cell of endometrium; body of uterus / Top expressed in: fossa; condyle; primitive streak; hair follicle; renal corpuscle; internal carotid artery; esophagus; vas deferens; external carotid artery; skin of abdomen; More reference expression data
BioGPS	More reference expression data
Gene ontology
Molecular function	peptidase activity; hydrolase activity; carboxypeptidase activity; cysteine-type endopeptidase activity; protein binding; cysteine-type peptidase activity; aminopeptidase activity; identical protein binding
Cellular component	extracellular exosome; cytosol; nucleus; cytoplasm
Biological process	protein polyubiquitination; proteolysis; response to toxic substance; homocysteine catabolic process
Sources:Amigo / QuickGO
Orthologs
Databases	NCBI: entry; OMA: entry
Species	Human	Mouse
Entrez	642	104184
Ensembl	ENSG00000108578	ENSMUSG00000020840
UniProt	Q13867	Q8R016
RefSeq (mRNA)	NM_000386	NM_178645
RefSeq (protein)	NP_000377	NP_848760
Location (UCSC)	Chr 17: 30.25 – 30.29 Mb	Chr 11: 76.82 – 76.88 Mb
PubMed search
- Wikidata
View/Edit Human	View/Edit Mouse

Bleomycin hydrolase is an enzyme that in humans is encoded by the BLMH gene.

Bleomycin hydrolase (BMH) is a cytoplasmic cysteine peptidase that is highly conserved through evolution. Its biological function is hydrolysis of the reactive electrophile homocysteine thiolactone. Another of its activities is metabolic inactivation of the glycopeptide bleomycin (BLM), an essential component of combination chemotherapy regimens for cancer. The protein contains the signature active site residues of the cysteine protease papain superfamily.

== Interactions ==
BLMH has been shown to interact with RPL29, RPL11, UBE2I and Amyloid precursor protein.

== In popular culture ==
A color shifted image of the bleomycin hydrolase ribbon diagram is used as the structural depiction of the "SCP-008" entry of the SCP Foundation writing project.
