= WPP domain =

Identifiers
- Symbol: WPP
- Pfam: PF13943
Available protein structures:
- Pfam: structures / ECOD
- PDB: RCSB PDB; PDBe; PDBj
- PDBsum: structure summary

The WPP domain is a protein domain thought to be exclusively found in plants, first identified in 2000. The domain is about 90 amino acid residues long.

The domain is known to direct RanGAP to the nuclear envelope. Non-RanGAP nuclear envelope proteins are also known to encode WPP domains, such as MFP1 attachment factor 1 (MAF1), WPP1 and WPP2.

The WPP stands for a tryptophan-proline-proline motif that is highly conserved in the domain. Either deletion of the WPP domain or mutation of both the namesake tryptophan and first proline residues into alanine in the Arabidopsis thaliana protein RanGAP1 leads to mis-targeting in the majority of cells.

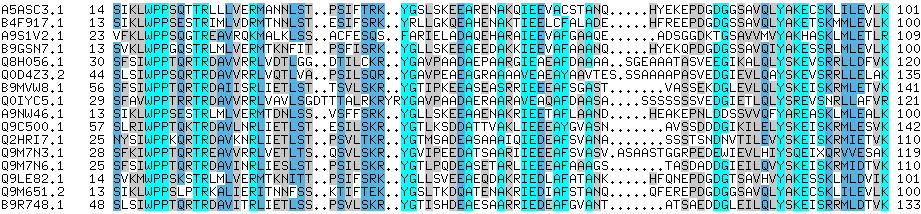
A multiple sequence alignment of proteins containing a WPP domain showing the conserved WPP sequence motif to the left.
