= UBA2 =

Protein-coding gene in humans

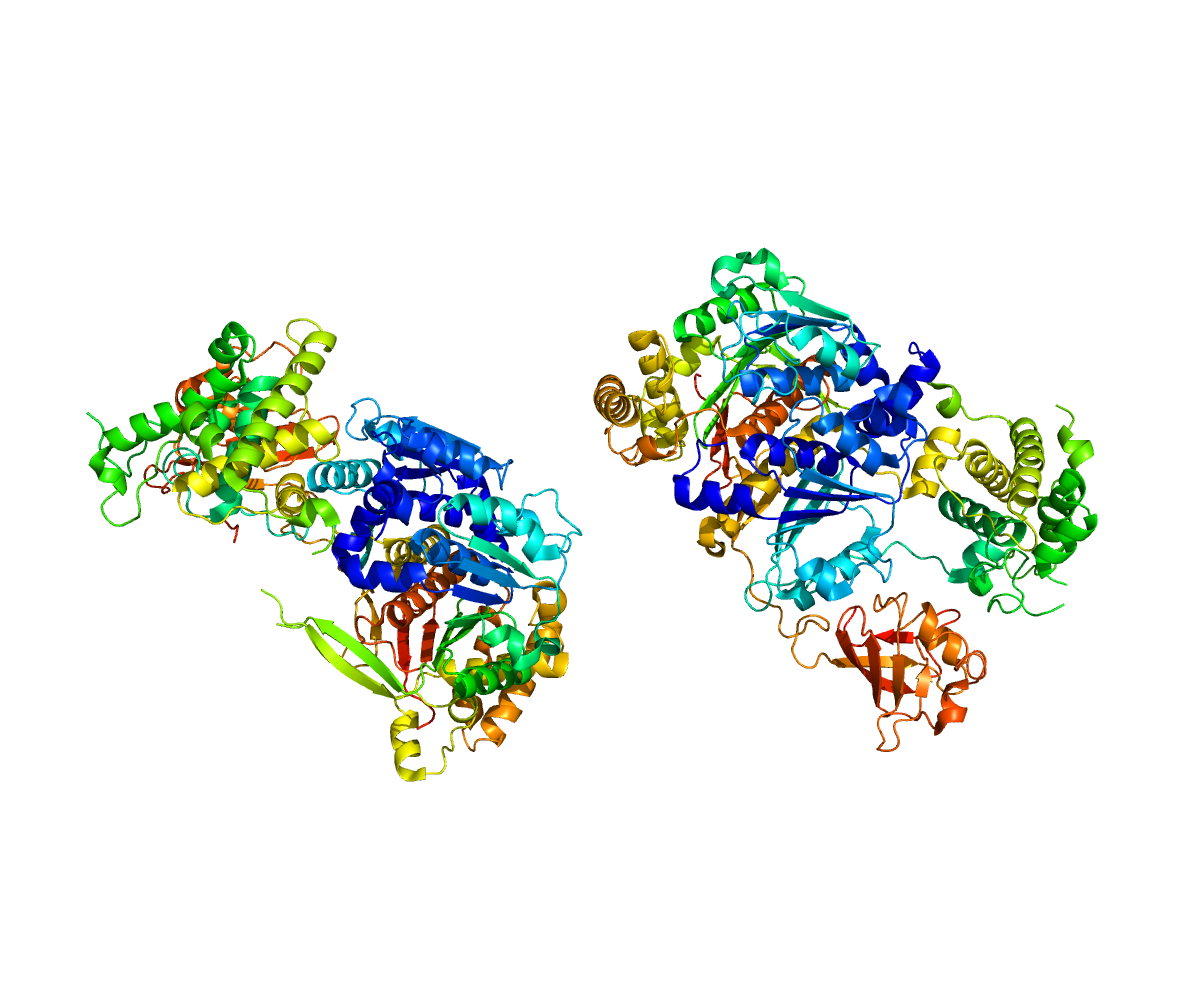

Identifiers
- Aliases: UBA2, ARX, SAE2, HRIHFB2115, ubiquitin like modifier activating enzyme 2
- External IDs: OMIM: 613295; MGI: 1858313; GeneCards: UBA2
Available structures
PDB	Ortholog search: PDBe RCSB
PDB	List of PDB id codes 1Y8Q, 1Y8R, 2PX9, 3KYC, 3KYD, 4W5V

Gene location (Human)
Chr.	Chromosome 19 (human)
Band	19q13.11	Start	34,428,352 bp
Band	19q13.11	End	34,471,251 bp

Gene location (Mouse)
Chr.	Chromosome 7 (mouse)
Band	7|7 B1	Start	33,840,113 bp
Band	7|7 B1	End	33,869,024 bp
RNA expression pattern
Bgee	Human / Mouse (ortholog); Top expressed in: ventricular zone; ganglionic eminence; Achilles tendon; popliteal artery; tibial arteries; right coronary artery; gonad; left coronary artery; thoracic aorta; ascending aorta / Top expressed in: otic placode; otic vesicle; saccule; primitive streak; renal corpuscle; somite; medial ganglionic eminence; abdominal wall; mandibular prominence; superior cervical ganglion; More reference expression data
BioGPS	n/a
Gene ontology
Molecular function	metal ion binding; nucleotide binding; enzyme activator activity; ubiquitin-like modifier activating enzyme activity; transcription factor binding; protein binding; SUMO activating enzyme activity; magnesium ion binding; ATP binding; SUMO binding; small protein activating enzyme binding; ubiquitin-like protein conjugating enzyme binding; protein heterodimerization activity; acid-amino acid ligase activity; transferase activity
Cellular component	nucleus; SUMO activating enzyme complex; nucleoplasm; cytoplasm
Biological process	protein sumoylation; positive regulation of catalytic activity; protein modification by small protein conjugation
Sources:Amigo / QuickGO
Orthologs
Databases	NCBI: entry; OMA: entry
Species	Human	Mouse
Entrez	10054	50995
Ensembl	ENSG00000126261	ENSMUSG00000052997
UniProt	Q9UBT2	Q9Z1F9
RefSeq (mRNA)	NM_005499	NM_016682
RefSeq (protein)	NP_005490	NP_057891
Location (UCSC)	Chr 19: 34.43 – 34.47 Mb	Chr 7: 33.84 – 33.87 Mb
PubMed search
- Wikidata
View/Edit Human	View/Edit Mouse

SUMO-activating enzyme subunit 2 (SAE2) is an enzyme that in humans is encoded by the UBA2 gene (previously UBLE1B).

Posttranslational modification of proteins by the addition of the small protein SUMO (see SUMO1), or sumoylation, regulates protein structure and intracellular localization. SAE1 and UBA2 form a heterodimer that functions as a SUMO-activating enzyme for the sumoylation of proteins.

== Structure ==
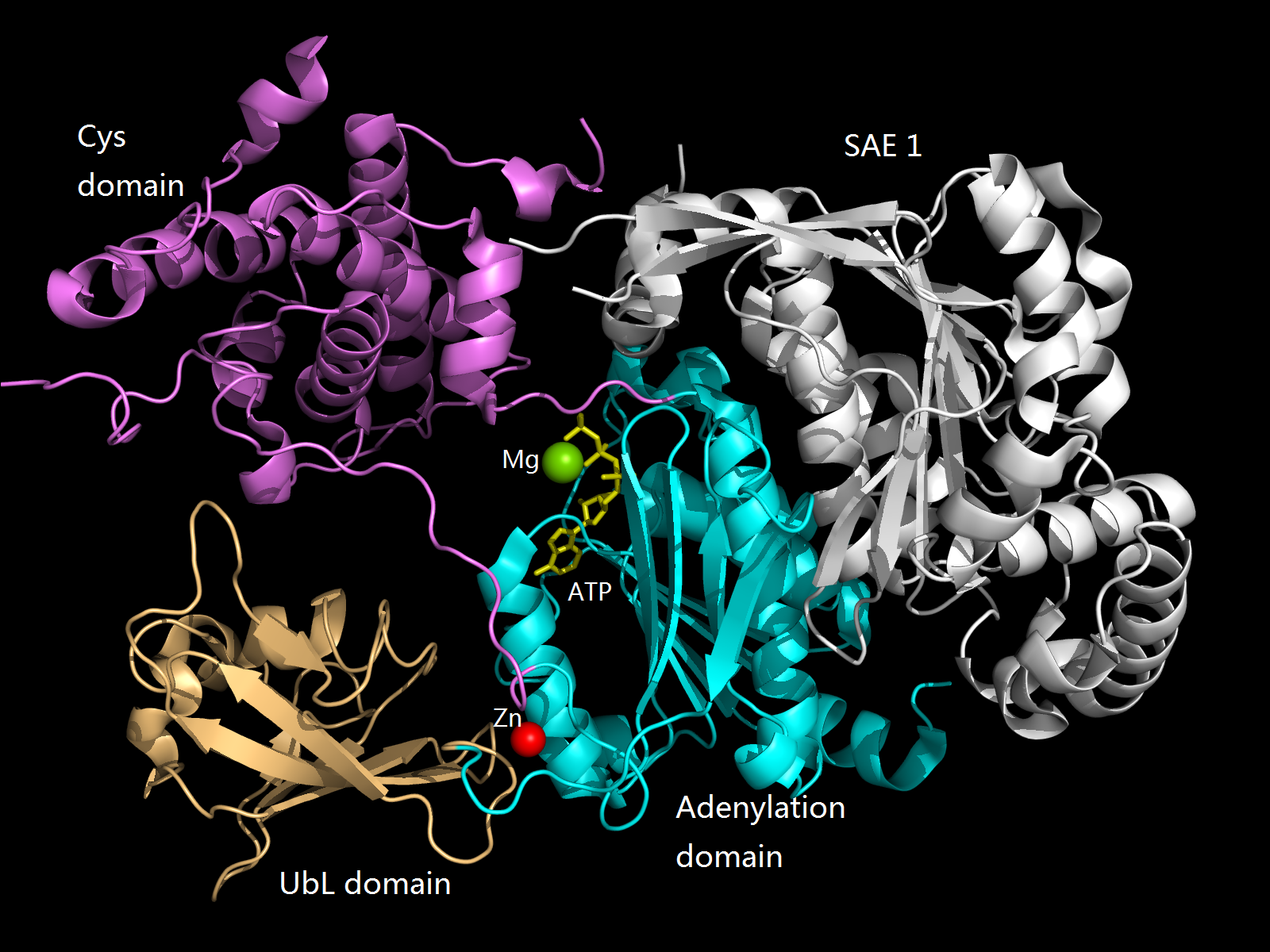
SAE in conjugation with Mg and ATP

=== DNA ===
The UBA2 cDNA fragment 2683 bp long and encodes a peptide of 640 amino acids. The predicted protein sequence is more analogous to yeast UBA2 (35% identity) than human UBA3 or E1 (in ubiquitin pathway). The UBA gene is located on chromosome 19.

=== Protein ===
Uba2 subunit is 640 aa residues long with a molecular weight of 72 kDa. It consists of three domains: an adenylation domain (containing adenylation active site), a catalytic Cys domain (containing the catalytic Cys173 residue participated in thioester bond formation), and a ubiquitin-like domain. SUMO-1 binds on Uba2 between the catalytic Cys domain and UbL domain.

== Mechanism ==
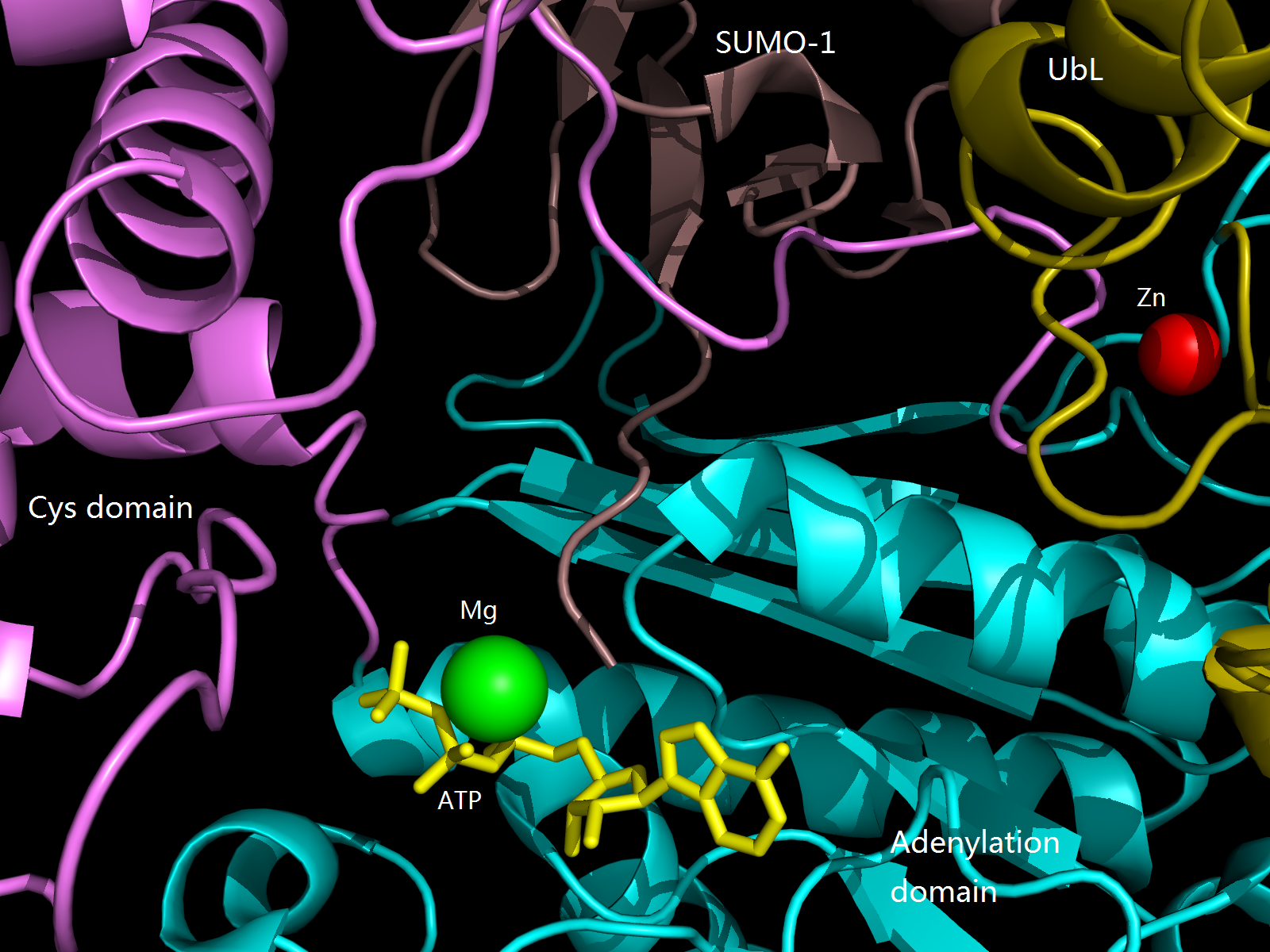
UBA2 in conjugation with SUMO-1.

SUMO activating enzyme (E1, heterodimer of SAE1 and UBA2) catalyzes the reaction of activating SUMO-1 and transferring it to Ubc9 (the only known E2 for SUMOylation). The reaction happens in three steps: adenylation, thioester bond formation, and SUMO transfer to E2. First, the carboxyl group of SUMO C-terminal glycine residue attacks ATP, forming SUMO-AMP and pyrophosphate. Next, the thiol group of a catalytic cysteine in the UBA2 active site attacks SUMO-AMP, forming a high energy thioester bond between UBA2 and the C-terminal glycine of SUMO and releasing AMP. Finally, SUMO is transferred to an E2 cysteine, forming another thioester bond.

== Function ==
Ubiquitin tag has a well understood role of directing protein towards degradation by proteasome. The role SUMO molecules play are more complicated and much less well understood. SUMOylation consequences include altering substrate affinity for other proteins or with DNA, changing substrate localization, and blocking ubiquitin binding (which prevents substrate degradation). For some proteins, SUMOylation doesn’t seem to have a function.

=== NF-kB ===
Transcription factor NF-kB in unstimulated cells is inactivated by IkBa inhibitor protein binding. The activation of NF-kB is achieved by ubiquitination and subsequent degradation of IkBa. SUMOylation of IkBa has a strong inhibitory effect on NF-kB-dependent transcription. This may be a mechanism for cell to regulate the number of NF-kB available for transcriptional activation.

=== p53 ===
Transcription factor p53 is a tumor suppressor acting by activating genes involved in cell cycle regulation and apoptosis. Its level is regulated by mdm2-dependent ubiquitination. SUMOylation of p53 (at a distinct lysine residue from ubiquitin modification sites) prevents proteasome degradation and acts as an additional regulator to p53 response.

== Expression and regulation ==
Studies of yeast budding and fission have revealed that SUMOylation may be important in cell cycle regulation. During a cell cycle, the UBA2 concentration doesn't undergo substantial change while SAE1 level shows dramatic fluctuation, suggesting regulation of SAE1 expression rather than UBA2 might be a way for cell to regulate SUMOylation. However, at time points when SAE1 levels are low, little evidence of UBA2-containing protein complexes are found other than SAE1-UBA2 heterodimer. One possible explanation would be that these complexes exist only for a short period of time, thus not obvious in cell extracts. UBA2 expression is found in most organs including the brain, lung and heart, indicating probable existence of SUMOylation pathway in these organs. An elevated level of UBA2 (as well as all other enzyme components of the pathway) is found in testis, suggesting possible role for UBA2 in meiosis or spermatogenesis. Inside the nucleus, UBA2 is distributed throughout nuclei but not found in nucleoli, suggesting SUMOylation may occur primarily in nuclei. Cytoplasmic existence of SAE 1 and UBA2 is also possible and is responsible for conjugation of cytoplasmic substrates.

== Interactions ==
SAE2 has been shown to interact with

- SAE1,
- Small ubiquitin-related modifier 1, and
- UBE2I.
