= 60S ribosomal protein L29 =

Protein found in humans

RPL29

Identifiers
- Aliases: RPL29, HIP, HUML29, RPL29P10, RPL29_3_370, ribosomal protein L29
- External IDs: OMIM: 601832; MGI: 99687; GeneCards: RPL29
Available structures
PDB	Ortholog search: PDBe RCSB
PDB	List of PDB id codes 4UG0, 4V6X, 5AJ0, 4UJD, 4D67, 4D5Y, 4UJE, 4UJC

Gene location (Human)
Chr.	Chromosome 3 (human)
Band	3p21.2	Start	51,993,522 bp
Band	3p21.2	End	51,995,895 bp

Gene location (Mouse)
Chr.	Chromosome 9 (mouse)
Band	9|9 F1	Start	106,306,653 bp
Band	9|9 F1	End	106,308,767 bp
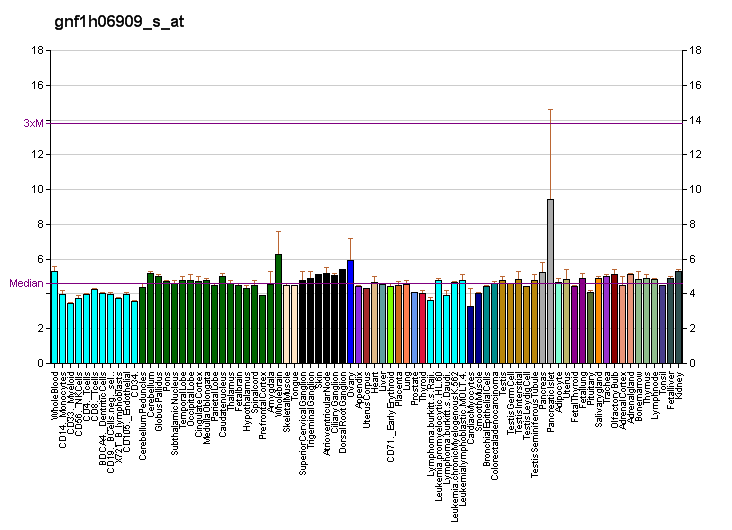

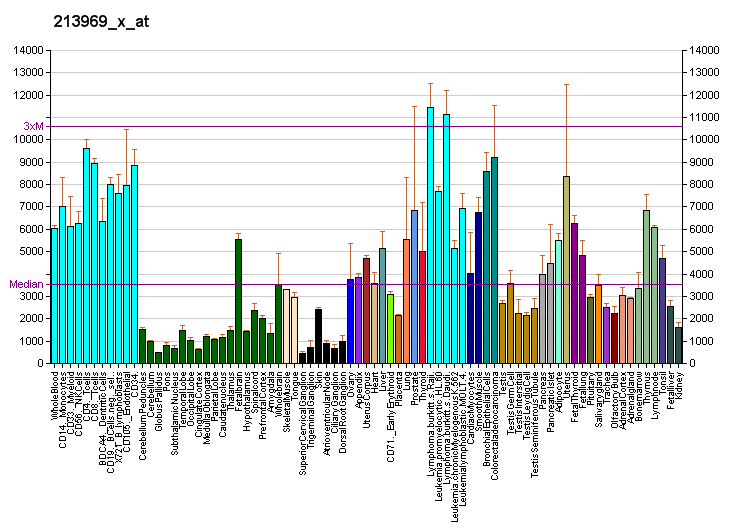

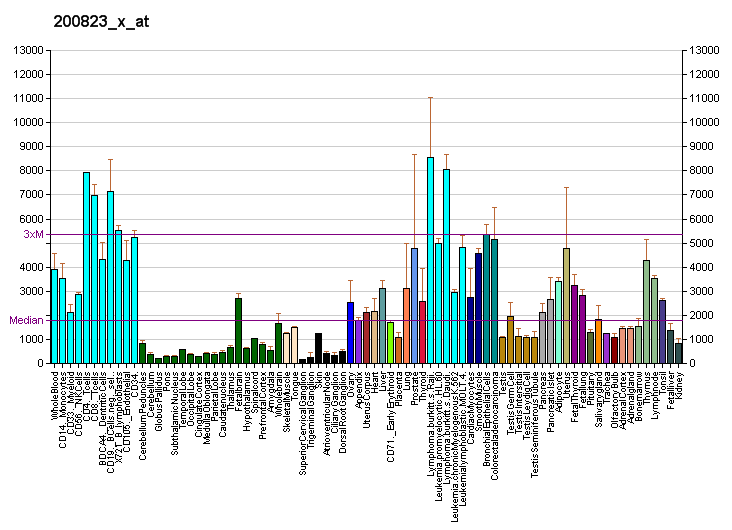
RNA expression pattern
Bgee	Human / Mouse (ortholog); Top expressed in: stromal cell of endometrium; skin of leg; left ovary; skin of abdomen; right ovary; ganglionic eminence; right uterine tube; right adrenal cortex; muscle of thigh; subcutaneous adipose tissue / Top expressed in: urinary bladder; ventricular zone; lip; tail of embryo; genital tubercle; ganglionic eminence; thymus; lens; adrenal gland; epiblast; More reference expression data
BioGPS	More reference expression data
Gene ontology
Molecular function	heparin binding; RNA binding; structural constituent of ribosome; cadherin binding
Cellular component	intracellular anatomical structure; cytosol; membrane; cytosolic large ribosomal subunit; ribosome
Biological process	translational initiation; SRP-dependent cotranslational protein targeting to membrane; nuclear-transcribed mRNA catabolic process, nonsense-mediated decay; cytoplasmic translation; embryo implantation; protein biosynthesis; viral transcription; rRNA processing
Sources:Amigo / QuickGO
Orthologs
Databases	NCBI: entry; OMA: entry
Species	Human	Mouse
Entrez	6159	19944
Ensembl	ENSG00000162244	ENSMUSG00000048758
UniProt	P47914	P47915
RefSeq (mRNA)	NM_000992	NM_009082; NM_001324533; NM_001324534
RefSeq (protein)	NP_000983	NP_001311462; NP_001311463; NP_033108
Location (UCSC)	Chr 3: 51.99 – 52 Mb	Chr 9: 106.31 – 106.31 Mb
PubMed search
- Wikidata
View/Edit Human	View/Edit Mouse

60S ribosomal protein L29 is a protein that in humans is encoded by the RPL29 gene.

== Function ==
Ribosomes, the organelles that catalyze protein synthesis, consist of a small 40S subunit and a large 60S subunit. Together these subunits are composed of 4 RNA species and approximately 80 structurally distinct proteins. This gene encodes a cytoplasmic ribosomal protein that is a component of the 60S subunit. The protein belongs to the L29E family of ribosomal proteins. The protein is also a peripheral membrane protein expressed on the cell surface that directly binds heparin. Although this gene was previously reported to map to 3q29-qter, it is believed that it is located at 3p21.3-p21.2. As is typical for genes encoding ribosomal proteins, there are multiple processed pseudogenes of this gene dispersed through the genome.

== Interactions ==
RPL29 has been shown to interact with BLMH.
