= NOP53 =

Protein-coding gene in humans

Identifiers
- Aliases: NOP53, PICT-1, PICT1, GLTSCR2, glioma tumor suppressor candidate region gene 2, NOP53 ribosome biogenesis factor
- External IDs: OMIM: 605691; MGI: 2154441; GeneCards: NOP53

Gene location (Human)
Chr.	Chromosome 19 (human)
Band	19q13.33	Start	47,745,546 bp
Band	19q13.33	End	47,757,058 bp

Gene location (Mouse)
Chr.	Chromosome 7 (mouse)
Band	7 8.64 cM|7 A2	Start	15,670,108 bp
Band	7 8.64 cM|7 A2	End	15,679,999 bp
RNA expression pattern
Bgee	Human / Mouse (ortholog); Top expressed in: left ovary; body of pancreas; right ovary; skin of arm; skin of leg; ganglionic eminence; skin of abdomen; canal of the cervix; body of uterus; right uterine tube / Top expressed in: neural layer of retina; ventricular zone; yolk sac; lip; transitional epithelium of urinary bladder; muscle of thigh; esophagus; genital tubercle; molar; granulocyte; More reference expression data
BioGPS	n/a
Gene ontology
Molecular function	RNA binding; 5S rRNA binding; protein binding; p53 binding; identical protein binding
Cellular component	intracellular anatomical structure; intracellular membrane-bounded organelle; nucleus; nucleolus; cytosol; fibrillar center; rDNA heterochromatin; nucleoplasm
Biological process	ribosomal large subunit assembly; regulation of protein phosphorylation; protein stabilization; regulation of signal transduction by p53 class mediator; negative regulation of signal transduction by p53 class mediator; regulation of aerobic respiration; ribosomal large subunit export from nucleus; negative regulation of transcription by RNA polymerase II; DNA repair; mitotic G2 DNA damage checkpoint signaling; negative regulation of phosphatidylinositol 3-kinase signaling; negative regulation of protein-containing complex assembly; negative regulation of proteasomal ubiquitin-dependent protein catabolic process; positive regulation of proteasomal ubiquitin-dependent protein catabolic process; regulation of apoptotic process; regulation of cell cycle; cellular response to hypoxia; protein localization to nucleolus; protein localization to nucleoplasm; cellular response to DNA damage stimulus; regulation of RIG-I signaling pathway; negative regulation of protein kinase B signaling; negative regulation of transcription of nucleolar large rRNA by RNA polymerase I; positive regulation of protein K63-linked deubiquitination; ribosome biogenesis; rRNA processing
Sources:Amigo / QuickGO
Orthologs
Databases	NCBI: entry; OMA: entry
Species	Human	Mouse
Entrez	29997	68077
Ensembl	ENSG00000105373	ENSMUSG00000041560
UniProt	Q9NZM5	Q8BK35
RefSeq (mRNA)	NM_015710	NM_133831
RefSeq (protein)	NP_056525	NP_598592
Location (UCSC)	Chr 19: 47.75 – 47.76 Mb	Chr 7: 15.67 – 15.68 Mb
PubMed search
- Wikidata
View/Edit Human	View/Edit Mouse

Ribosome biogenesis protein NOP53 is a protein that in humans is encoded by the NOP53 gene (previously GLTSCR2).
