= SUMO4 =

Protein-coding gene in the species Homo sapiens

Identifiers
- Aliases: SUMO4, IDDM5, SMT3H4, SUMO-4, dJ281H8.4, small ubiquitin-like modifier 4, small ubiquitin like modifier 4
- External IDs: OMIM: 608829; GeneCards: SUMO4

Gene location (Human)
Chr.	Chromosome 6 (human)
Band	6q25.1	Start	149,400,262 bp
Band	6q25.1	End	149,401,278 bp
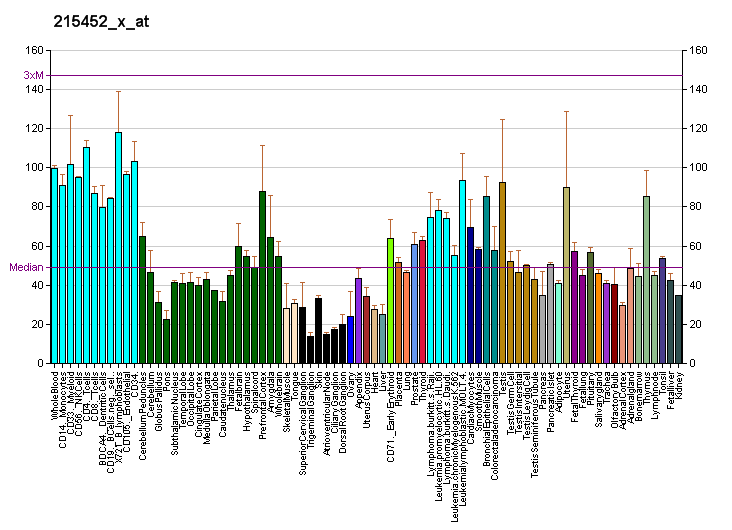
RNA expression pattern
Bgee	Human / Mouse (ortholog); Top expressed in: oocyte; buccal mucosa cell; lactiferous duct; pylorus; renal medulla; optic nerve; cardia; mucosa of pharynx; superior surface of tongue; vena cava / n/a; More reference expression data
BioGPS	More reference expression data
Gene ontology
Molecular function	protein tag; ubiquitin-like protein ligase binding
Cellular component	nucleus
Biological process	protein sumoylation
Sources:Amigo / QuickGO
Orthologs
Databases	NCBI: entry; OMA: entry
Species	Human	Mouse
Entrez	387082	n/a
Ensembl	ENSG00000177688	n/a
UniProt	Q6EEV6	n/a
RefSeq (mRNA)	NM_001002255	n/a
RefSeq (protein)	NP_001002255	n/a
Location (UCSC)	Chr 6: 149.4 – 149.4 Mb	n/a
PubMed search		n/a
- Wikidata
View/Edit Human

Small ubiquitin-related modifier 4 is a protein that in humans is encoded by the SUMO4 gene.

== Function ==
This gene is a member of the SUMO gene family. This family of genes encode small ubiquitin-related modifiers that are attached to proteins and control the target proteins' subcellular localization, stability, or activity. The protein described in this record is located in the cytoplasm and specifically modifies IKBA, leading to negative regulation of NF-kappa-B-dependent transcription of the IL12B gene. A specific polymorphism in this SUMO gene, which leads to the M55V substitution, has been associated with type I diabetes. The RefSeq contains this polymorphism.

== Interactions ==
SUMO4 has been shown to interact with IκBα.
