= SAE1 =

Protein-coding gene in the species Homo sapiens

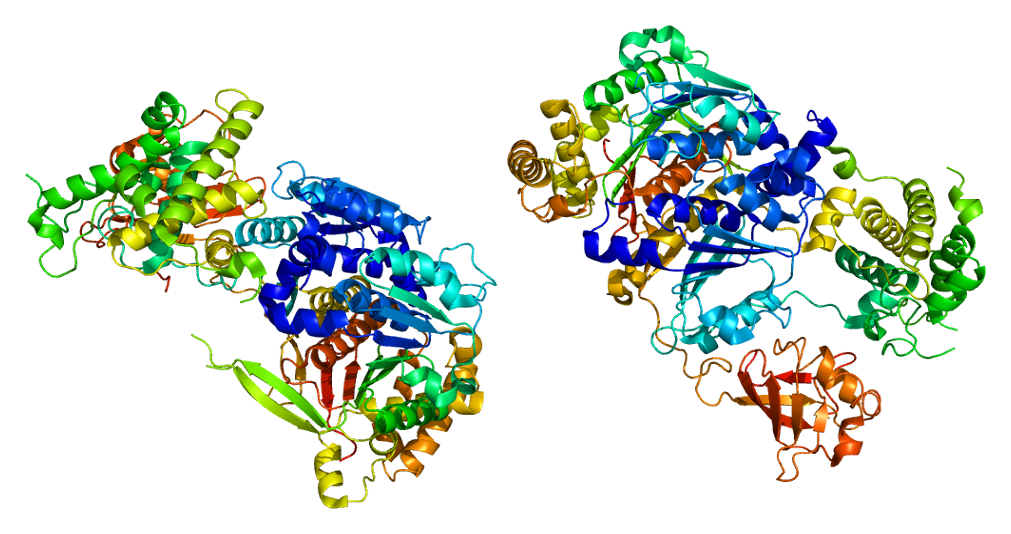

Identifiers
- Aliases: SAE1, AOS1, HSPC140, SUA1, UBLE1A, SUMO1 activating enzyme subunit 1
- External IDs: OMIM: 613294; MGI: 1929264; GeneCards: SAE1
Available structures
| PDB | Ortholog search: PDBe RCSB |
| PDB | List of PDB id codes 1Y8Q, 1Y8R, 3KYC, 3KYD |

Gene location (Human)
| Chr. | Chromosome 19 (human) |
| Band | 19q13.32 | Start | 47,113,274 bp |
| Band | 19q13.32 | End | 47,210,636 bp |

Gene location (Mouse)
| Chr. | Chromosome 7 (mouse) |
| Band | 7 A2|7 8.88 cM | Start | 16,054,159 bp |
| Band | 7 A2|7 8.88 cM | End | 16,121,731 bp |
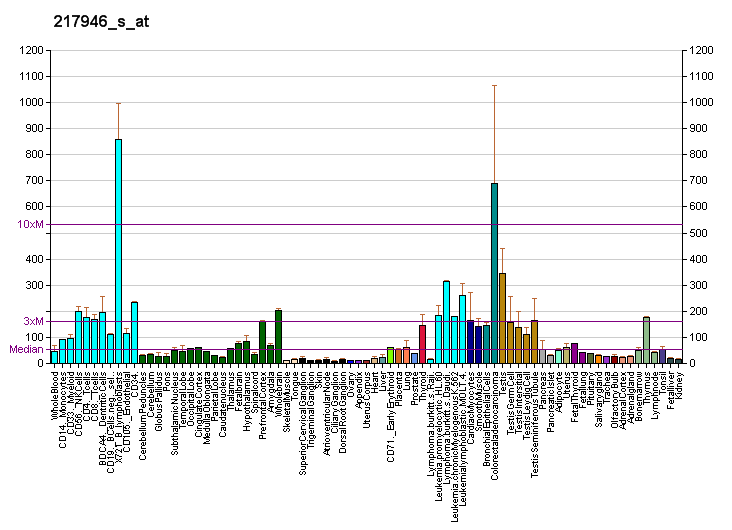
RNA expression pattern
| Bgee | Human / Mouse (ortholog); Top expressed in: ventricular zone; ganglionic eminence; muscle layer of sigmoid colon; stromal cell of endometrium; left testis; right testis; gonad; oocyte; prefrontal cortex; smooth muscle tissue / Top expressed in: ventricular zone; epiblast; primitive streak; somite; abdominal wall; mandibular prominence; neural tube; maxillary prominence; yolk sac; tail of embryo; More reference expression data |
| BioGPS | More reference expression data |
Gene ontology
| Molecular function | ubiquitin activating enzyme activity; SUMO activating enzyme activity; enzyme activator activity; ligase activity; protein C-terminus binding; ubiquitin-like modifier activating enzyme activity; protein binding; ATP-dependent protein binding; small protein activating enzyme binding; protein heterodimerization activity |
| Cellular component | SUMO activating enzyme complex; nucleus; nucleoplasm; cytoplasm |
| Biological process | protein sumoylation; protein ubiquitination; positive regulation of protein targeting to mitochondrion; positive regulation of catalytic activity |
Sources:Amigo / QuickGO
Orthologs
| Databases | NCBI: entry; OMA: entry |
| Species | Human | Mouse |
| Entrez | 10055 | 56459 |
| Ensembl | ENSG00000142230 | ENSMUSG00000052833 |
| UniProt | Q9UBE0 | Q9R1T2 |
| RefSeq (mRNA) | NM_001145713; NM_001145714; NM_005500 | NM_001285891; NM_001285892; NM_019748 |
| RefSeq (protein) | NP_001139185; NP_001139186; NP_005491 | NP_001272820; NP_001272821; NP_062722 |
| Location (UCSC) | Chr 19: 47.11 – 47.21 Mb | Chr 7: 16.05 – 16.12 Mb |
| PubMed search |
- Wikidata
| View/Edit Human | View/Edit Mouse |

SUMO-activating enzyme subunit 1 is a protein that in humans is encoded by the SAE1 gene.

== Interactions ==
SAE1 has been shown to interact with SAE2, the protein product of the gene UBA2.
