= RANGAP1 =

Protein-coding gene in the species Homo sapiens

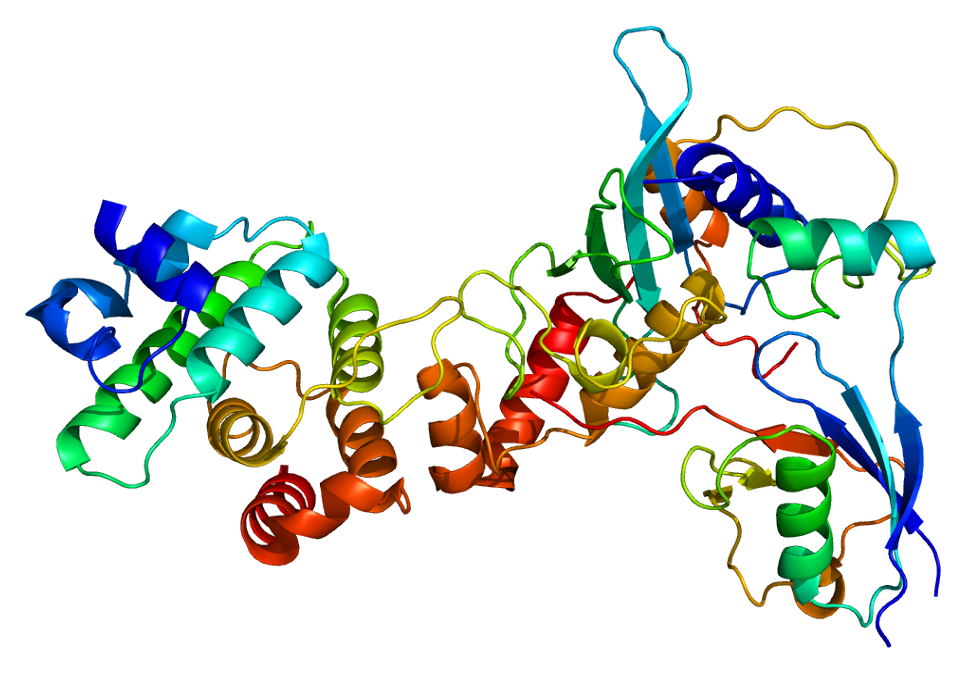
Available structures
PDB	Ortholog search: PDBe RCSB
PDB	List of PDB id codes 1Z5S, 2GRN, 2GRO, 2GRP, 2GRQ, 2GRR, 2IY0, 3UIN, 3UIO, 3UIP, 5D2M, 2IO2, 2IO3

Identifiers
- Aliases: RANGAP1, Fug1, RANGAP, SD, Ran GTPase activating protein 1
- External IDs: OMIM: 602362; MGI: 103071; HomoloGene: 55700; GeneCards: RANGAP1; OMA:RANGAP1 - orthologs

Gene location (Human)
Chr.	Chromosome 22 (human)
Band	22q13.2	Start	41,244,779 bp
Band	22q13.2	End	41,286,187 bp

Gene location (Mouse)
Chr.	Chromosome 15 (mouse)
Band	15 E1|15 38.21 cM	Start	81,588,449 bp
Band	15 E1|15 38.21 cM	End	81,629,731 bp
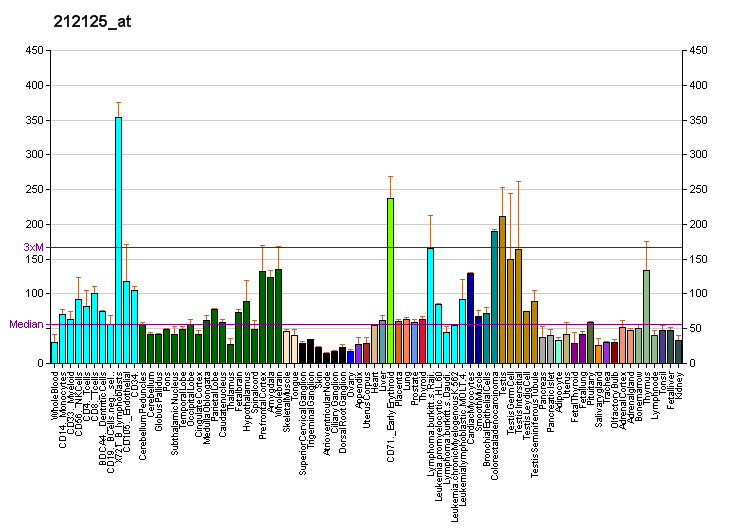

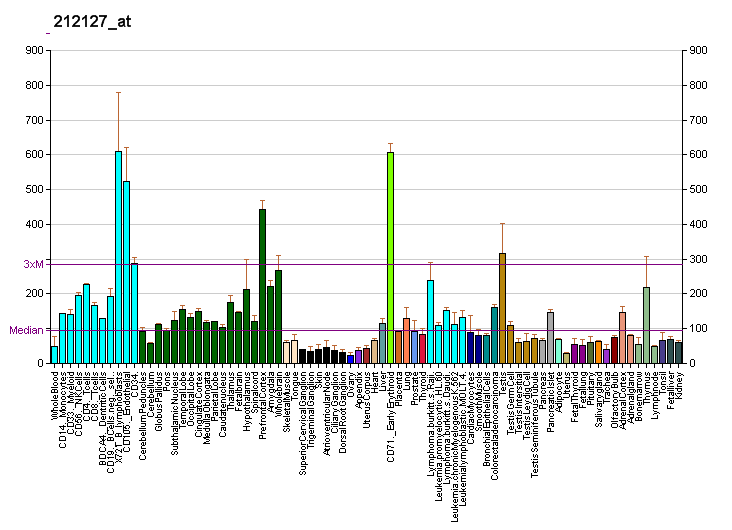
RNA expression pattern
Bgee	Human / Mouse (ortholog); Top expressed in: left testis; right testis; Brodmann area 10; right frontal lobe; cingulate gyrus; anterior cingulate cortex; skin of abdomen; Brodmann area 9; skin of leg; middle frontal gyrus / Top expressed in: dentate gyrus of hippocampal formation granule cell; superior surface of tongue; spermatid; yolk sac; visual cortex; superior frontal gyrus; seminiferous tubule; gallbladder; primary visual cortex; epiblast; More reference expression data
BioGPS	More reference expression data
Gene ontology
Molecular function	protein binding; cadherin binding; RNA binding; GTPase activator activity; ubiquitin protein ligase binding
Cellular component	intracellular membrane-bounded organelle; cytoplasmic periphery of the nuclear pore complex; nuclear pore; chromosome; dendrite; nuclear pore cytoplasmic filaments; mitotic spindle; chromosome, centromeric region; cytoskeleton; nucleus; kinetochore; axon cytoplasm; cytoplasm; cytosol; aggresome; perinuclear region of cytoplasm; nuclear envelope; nucleoplasm; spindle; nuclear membrane
Biological process	cellular response to vasopressin; protein sumoylation; cellular response to peptide hormone stimulus; negative regulation of protein export from nucleus; response to axon injury; signal transduction; sister chromatid cohesion; activation of GTPase activity
Sources:Amigo / QuickGO
Orthologs
Species	Human	Mouse
Entrez	5905	19387
Ensembl	ENSG00000100401	ENSMUSG00000022391
UniProt	P46060	P46061
RefSeq (mRNA)	NM_001278651; NM_002883; NM_001317930	NM_001146174; NM_011241; NM_001358622
RefSeq (protein)	NP_001265580; NP_001304859; NP_002874	NP_001139646; NP_035371; NP_001345551
Location (UCSC)	Chr 22: 41.24 – 41.29 Mb	Chr 15: 81.59 – 81.63 Mb
PubMed search
- Wikidata
View/Edit Human	View/Edit Mouse

Ran GTPase-activating protein 1 is an enzyme that in humans is encoded by the RANGAP1 gene.

== Function ==
RanGAP1, is a homodimeric 65-kD polypeptide that specifically induces the GTPase activity of RAN, but not of RAS by over 1,000-fold. RanGAP1 is the immediate antagonist of RCC1, a regulator molecule that keeps RAN in the active, GTP-bound state. The RANGAP1 gene encodes a 587-amino acid polypeptide. The sequence is unrelated to that of GTPase activators for other RAS-related proteins, but is 88% identical to Rangap1 (Fug1), the murine homolog of yeast Rna1p. RanGAP1 and RCC1 control RAN-dependent transport between the nucleus and cytoplasm. RanGAP1 is a key regulator of the RAN GTP/GDP cycle.

== Interactions ==
RanGAP1 is a trafficking protein which helps transport other proteins from the cytoplasm to the nucleus. Small ubiquitin-related modifier needs to be associated with it before it can be localized at the nuclear pore.

RANGAP1 has been shown to interact with:

- Ran, and
- UBE2I.
