= SUMO1 =

Protein-coding gene in the species Homo sapiens

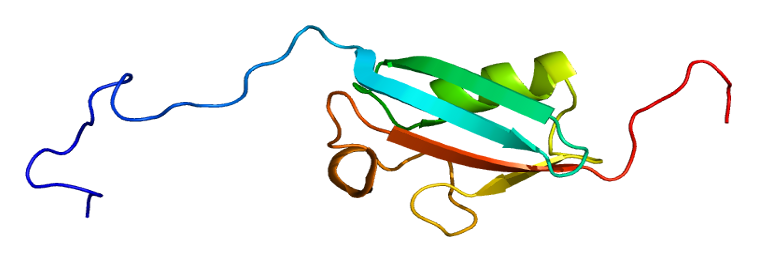

Identifiers
- Aliases: SUMO1, DAP1, GMP1, OFC10, PIC1, SENP2, SMT3, SMT3C, SMT3H3, UBL1, small ubiquitin-like modifier 1, small ubiquitin like modifier 1
- External IDs: OMIM: 601912; MGI: 1197010; GeneCards: SUMO1
Available structures
PDB	Ortholog search: PDBe RCSB
PDB	List of PDB id codes 4WJQ, 1A5R, 1TGZ, 1WYW, 1Y8R, 1Z5S, 2ASQ, 2BF8, 2G4D, 2IO2, 2IY0, 2IY1, 2KQS, 2LAS, 2MW5, 2PE6, 2UYZ, 2VRR, 3KYC, 3KYD, 3RZW, 3UIP, 4WJN, 4WJO, 4WJP, 5AEK, 2N1V, 2N1A

Gene location (Human)
Chr.	Chromosome 2 (human)
Band	2q33.1	Start	202,206,180 bp
Band	2q33.1	End	202,238,608 bp

Gene location (Mouse)
Chr.	Chromosome 1 (mouse)
Band	1|1 C2	Start	59,625,717 bp
Band	1|1 C2	End	59,709,993 bp
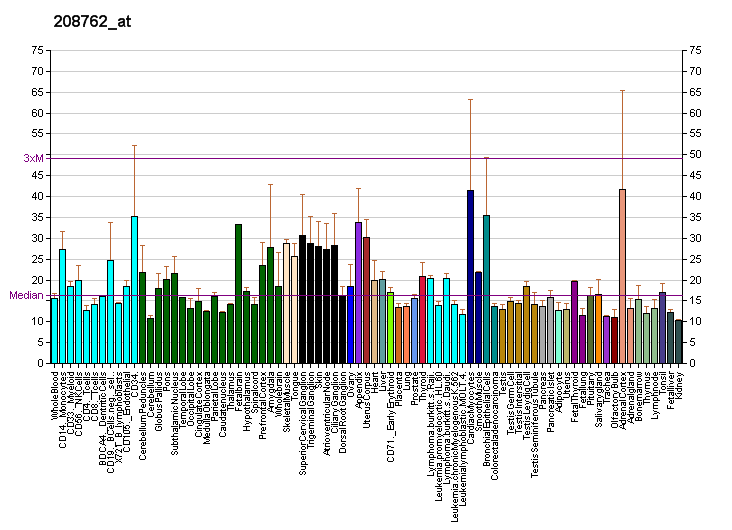

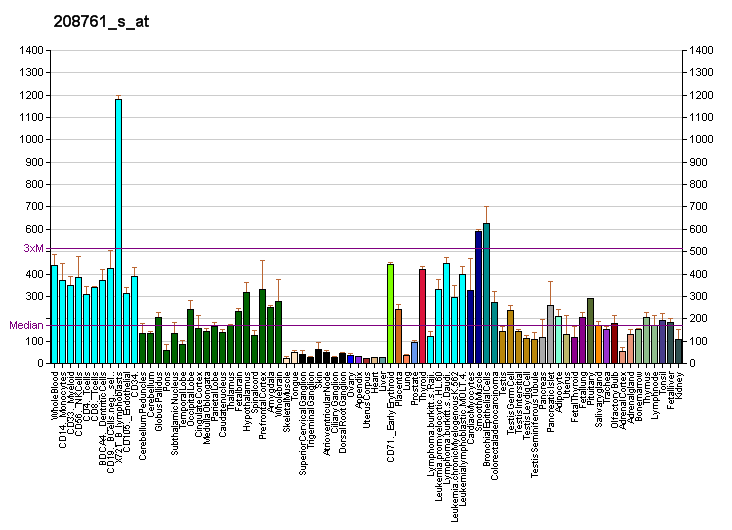

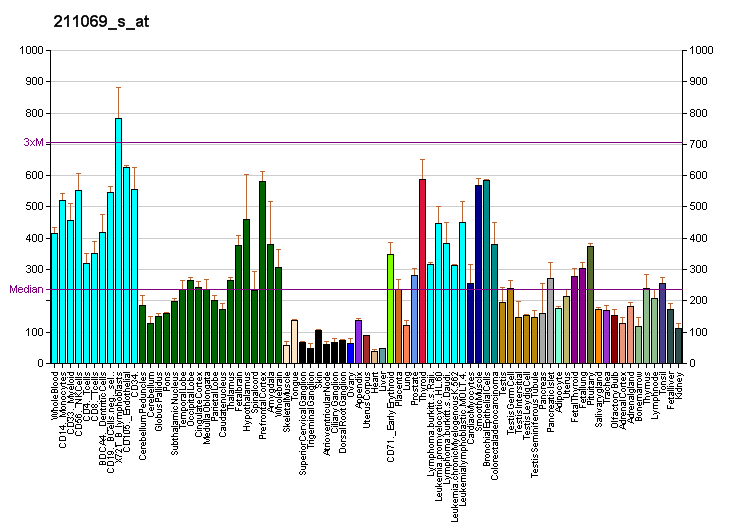
RNA expression pattern
Bgee	Human / Mouse (ortholog); Top expressed in: ganglionic eminence; ventricular zone; monocyte; rectum; gallbladder; right adrenal cortex; olfactory zone of nasal mucosa; epithelium of colon; anterior cingulate cortex; left adrenal gland / Top expressed in: morula; epiblast; neural tube; ventricular zone; ganglionic eminence; embryo; blastocyst; embryo; mesencephalon; ovary; More reference expression data
BioGPS	More reference expression data
Gene ontology
Molecular function	transcription factor binding; potassium channel regulator activity; protein binding; protein tag; ubiquitin protein ligase binding; RNA binding; transcription corepressor binding; protein C-terminus binding; SUMO transferase activity; enzyme binding; protein-macromolecule adaptor activity; glucocorticoid receptor binding; small protein activating enzyme binding; ubiquitin-like protein ligase binding
Cellular component	cytoplasm; PML body; nuclear speck; nuclear body; nuclear membrane; membrane; voltage-gated potassium channel complex; plasma membrane; synapse; nuclear pore; nucleoplasm; heterochromatin; XY body; dendrite; nucleolus; fibrillar center; nucleus; nuclear stress granule; SUMO activating enzyme complex; nuclear envelope; cytosol
Biological process	roof of mouth development; regulation of transcription, DNA-templated; regulation of protein stability; positive regulation of protein-containing complex assembly; protein localization to nuclear pore; protein stabilization; negative regulation of action potential; negative regulation of DNA-binding transcription factor activity; regulation of protein localization; regulation of cardiac muscle cell contraction; global genome nucleotide-excision repair; PML body organization; regulation of interferon-gamma-mediated signaling pathway; viral process; negative regulation of transcription, DNA-templated; double-strand break repair via nonhomologous end joining; regulation of calcium ion transmembrane transport; positive regulation of proteasomal ubiquitin-dependent protein catabolic process; negative regulation of delayed rectifier potassium channel activity; positive regulation of ATPase-coupled calcium transmembrane transporter activity; DNA repair; negative regulation of transcription by RNA polymerase II; cellular response to heat; cellular response to cadmium ion; protein sumoylation; negative regulation of DNA binding
Sources:Amigo / QuickGO
Orthologs
Databases	NCBI: entry; OMA: entry
Species	Human	Mouse
Entrez	7341	22218
Ensembl	ENSG00000116030	ENSMUSG00000026021
UniProt	P63165	P63166
RefSeq (mRNA)	NM_003352; NM_001005781; NM_001005782	NM_009460
RefSeq (protein)	NP_001005781; NP_001005782; NP_003343; NP_001358321; NP_001358322 NP_001358323	NP_033486
Location (UCSC)	Chr 2: 202.21 – 202.24 Mb	Chr 1: 59.63 – 59.71 Mb
PubMed search
- Wikidata
View/Edit Human	View/Edit Mouse

Small ubiquitin-related modifier 1 is a protein that in humans is encoded by the SUMO1 gene.

== Function ==
This gene encodes a protein that is a member of the SUMO (small ubiquitin-like modifier) protein family. It is a ubiquitin-like protein and functions in a manner similar to ubiquitin in that it is bound to target proteins as part of a post-translational modification system. However, unlike ubiquitin, which is primarily associated with targeting proteins for proteasomal degradation, SUMO1 is involved in a variety of cellular processes, such as nuclear transport, transcriptional regulation, apoptosis, and protein stability. It is not active until the last four amino acids of the carboxy-terminus have been cleaved off. Several pseudogenes have been reported for this gene. Alternate transcriptional splice variants encoding different isoforms have been characterized.

Most cleft genes have a sumoylation component. Analysis of chromosomal anomalies in patients has led to the identification and confirmation of SUMO1 as a cleft lip and palate locus.

== Role in the heart ==
SUMO1 is a key component in cardiac function, since it helps regulate calcium homeostasis in the mitochondria of heart cells. SUMO1 is associated with another essential cardiac protein called sarco/endoplasmic reticulum Ca^{2+} ATPase, or SERCA2A (also called ATP2A2). SERCA is a transmembrane protein located in the sarcoplasmic reticulum of cardiac cells. Its main function is to regulate the discharge and uptake of intracellular calcium between the cytosol and the lumen of the sarcoplasmic reticulum. Calcium is an essential factor for the development of cardiac myocyte contraction and relaxation. Thus, the management of intracellular calcium homeostasis by SERCA2A is critical for overall cardiac performance.

Normally, SUMO1 activates and stabilizes SERCA2A by binding at lysine resides 480 and 585. The interaction between SUMO 1 and SERCA2A is crucial for regulating calcium levels inside cardiac myocytes. Reduction in SUMO1 protein reduces SERCA2A, and thus efficient calcium handling in patients with failing hearts.

== As a drug target ==
SUMO1 may be an important therapeutic target to help improve cardiac performance in patients with heart failure. In a mouse model, the introduction of SUMO1 through gene therapy was associated with improved activity of SERCA2A, which resulted in improved cardiac function through an augmentation of cardiac contractility. Furthermore, overexpression of SUMO1 resulted in accelerated calcium uptake, providing further evidence regarding its importance in maintaining adequate calcium levels in heart cells.

== See also ==
- SENP6
