= Mendelian susceptibility to mycobacterial disease =

- Other names: Mendelian susceptibility to atypical mycobacteria
- Specialty: Immunology

Mendelian susceptibility to mycobacterial disease (MSMD) is a rare genetic disease. It is a primary immunodeficiency featured by molecular defects in IL12/IFNγ dependent signalling pathway, leading to increased susceptibility to local or disseminated infections by environmental mycobacteria, Mycobacterium bovis Bacille Calmette-Guerin strain, nontyphoidal and typhoidal Salmonella serotypes.

== Symptoms and signs ==
Normally patients who suffer from this disease are young children under 3 years which have also lack of response to IFN-γ cytokine replacement therapy. This disease is very rare and have high index of mortality. Following symptoms and signs are:

- recurrent wheezing
- dyspnea
- asthma-like symptoms
- recurring fever
- productive cough
- endobronchial mycobacterial infection
- low hemoglobin

Patients with IFNγR1 deficiency can also suffer of disorders of the lung, parenchymal lung diseases caused by mycobacterial infections, hylar lymphadenopathy, or endobronchial disease. If these patients have nontubercular mycobacterial infection there should be suspicion for immunodeficiency.

Transplantation of hematopoietic stem cell is the only one curative therapy for these patients. Children with partial MSMD usually have milder clinical phenotype, later onset, less severe infections, better response for IFNγ and antibiotic therapy, better survival rates and normally they don't need hematopoietic stem cell transplant.

== Pathophysiology ==
Phagocytes are important components of the innate immune system for the body defence against infections by mycobacteria and other intracellular pathogens. The professional phagocytes include neutrophils, dendritic cells, macrophages and monocytes. These cells engulf the pathogens by phagocytosis and activate the adaptive immune system to facilitate the elimination of the infection. Cytokine signalling is the key for the interplay between the innate and adaptive limbs of the immune system, the most important of which is the IL12-dependent, IFNγ-mediated pathway.

The phagocytes recognize mycobacteria and other pathogens by their pattern recognition receptors (PRR), which include Toll-like receptors (TLR) and NOD2. Once the pathogen is phagocytosed, the macrophages secrete IL12, which is a heterodimer formed by IL12p40 and IL12p35. IL12 receptors, composed of IL12Rβ1 and IL12Rβ2 subunits, are expressed on T lymphocytes and NK cells. It is associated with the signalling cascade formed by TYK and JAK2 kinases, eventually leading to STAT4 phosphorylation and nuclear translocation. The final response to IL12 stimulation is IFNγ production and secretion.

The IFNγ receptor is expressed on the macrophages and other cells and consists of IFNγR1 and IFNγR2 subunits. It is associated with the signalling pathway of JAK1 and JAK2, leading to the homodimerization of STAT1 molecule. It is the common pathway for enhancing expression of a variety of IFNγ-inducible genes, accounting for the confinement and killing of intracellular pathogens. Genetic defects impairing the IL12/IFNγ pathway increase the susceptibility to mycobacterial infections by impeding either the production or the response to IFNγ.

Since the discovery of MSMD in 1996, multiple autosomal and two X-linked genes are identified in MSMD phenotypes, classified under the category of defects in intrinsic and innate immunity in the 2017 IUIS Phenotypic Classification for Primary Immunodeficiencies. IFNγR1 deficiency was the first identified genetic disorder described as MSMD. Mutation in genes encoding IFNγR1 can be dominant or recessive and it can lead to partial or complete deficiency of this receptor. IFNγR1 gene is located in to chromosome 6q23.3 and it is formed of 22 868 base pairs which are composed in 7 exons.

== Diagnosis ==
Mendelian susceptibility to mycobacterial disease may be suspected in people with disseminated infections caused by environmental mycobacteria or BCG. Children with a complete deficiency in the interferon-gamma receptor have significant elevations in plasma concentrations of interferon-gamma, which can be measured by ELISA.
