= Immunity (medicine) =

State of being insusceptible or resistant to a noxious agent or process

In biology, immunity is the state of being insusceptible or resistant to a noxious agent or process, especially a pathogen or infectious disease. Immunity may occur naturally or be produced by prior exposure or immunization.

== Innate and adaptive ==
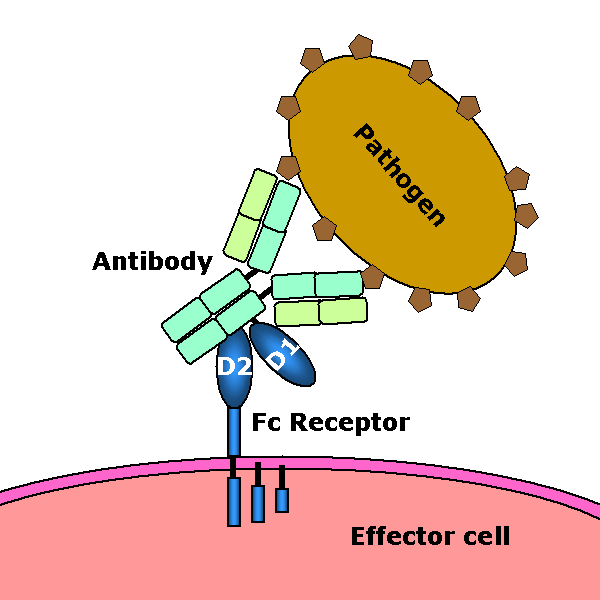
Scheme of a Fc receptor

The immune system has innate and adaptive components. Innate immunity is present in all metazoans, immune responses: inflammatory responses and phagocytosis. The adaptive component, on the other hand, involves more advanced lymphatic cells that can distinguish between specific "non-self" substances in the presence of "self". The reaction to foreign substances is etymologically described as inflammation while the non-reaction to self substances is described as immunity. The two components of the immune system create a dynamic biological environment where "health" can be seen as a physical state where the self is immunologically spared, and what is foreign is inflammatorily and immunologically eliminated. "Disease" can arise when what is foreign cannot be eliminated or what is self is not spared.

Innate immunity, also known as native immunity, is a semi-specific and widely distributed form of immunity. It is defined as the first line of defense against pathogens, representing a critical systemic response to prevent infection and maintain homeostasis, contributing to the activation of an adaptive immune response. It does not adapt to specific external stimulus or a prior infection, but relies on genetically encoded recognition of particular patterns.

Adaptive or acquired immunity is the active component of the host immune response, mediated by antigen-specific lymphocytes. Unlike the innate immunity, the acquired immunity is highly specific to a particular pathogen, including the development of immunological memory. Like the innate system, the acquired system includes both humoral immunity components and cell-mediated immunity components.

Adaptive immunity can be acquired either 'naturally' (by infection) or 'artificially' (through deliberate actions such as vaccination). Adaptive immunity can also be classified as 'active' or 'passive'. Active immunity is acquired through the exposure to a pathogen, which triggers the production of antibodies by the immune system. Passive immunity is acquired through the transfer of antibodies or activated T-cells derived from an immune host either artificially or through the placenta; it is short-lived, requiring booster doses for continued immunity.

The diagram below summarizes these divisions of immunity. Adaptive immunity recognizes more diverse patterns. Unlike innate immunity it is associated with memory of the pathogen.

== History of theories ==
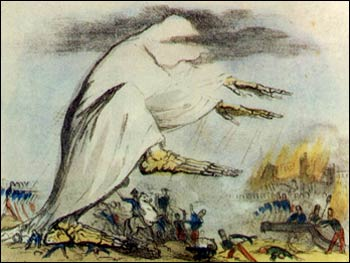
A representation of the cholera epidemic of the 19th century

For thousands of years mankind has been intrigued with the causes of disease and the concept of immunity. The prehistoric view was that disease was caused by supernatural forces, and that illness was a form of theurgic punishment for "bad deeds" or "evil thoughts" visited upon the soul by the gods or by one's enemies. In Classical Greek times, Hippocrates, who is regarded as the Father of Medicine, attributed diseases to an alteration or imbalance in one of the four humors (blood, phlegm, yellow bile or black bile). The first written descriptions of the concept of immunity may have been made by the Athenian Thucydides who, in 430 BC, described that when the plague hit Athens: "the sick and the dying were tended by the pitying care of those who had recovered, because they knew the course of the disease and were themselves free from apprehensions. For no one was ever attacked a second time, or not with a fatal result".

Active immunotherapy may have begun with Mithridates VI of Pontus (120-63 BC) who, to induce active immunity for snake venom, recommended using a method similar to modern toxoid serum therapy, by drinking the blood of animals which fed on venomous snakes. He is thought to have assumed that those animals acquired some detoxifying property, so that their blood would contain transformed components of the snake venom that could induce resistance to it instead of exerting a toxic effect. Mithridates reasoned that, by drinking the blood of these animals, he could acquire a similar resistance. Fearing assassination by poison, he took daily sub-lethal doses of venom to build tolerance. He is also said to have sought to create a 'universal antidote' to protect him from all poisons. For nearly 2000 years, poisons were thought to be the proximate cause of disease, and a complicated mixture of ingredients, called Mithridate, was used to cure poisoning during the Renaissance. An updated version of this cure, Theriacum Andromachi, was used well into the 19th century. The term "immunes" is also found in the epic poem "Pharsalia" written around 60 BC by the poet Marcus Annaeus Lucanus to describe a North African tribe's resistance to snake venom.

The first clinical description of immunity which arose from a specific disease-causing organism is probably A Treatise on Smallpox and Measles ("Kitab fi al-jadari wa-al-hasbah″, translated 1848) written by the Islamic physician Al-Razi in the 9th century. In the treatise, Al Razi describes the clinical presentation of smallpox and measles and goes on to indicate that exposure to these specific agents confers lasting immunity (although he does not use this term).

Until the 19th century, the miasma theory was also widely accepted. The theory viewed diseases such as cholera or the Black Plague as being caused by a miasma, a noxious form of "bad air". If someone was exposed to the miasma in a swamp, in evening air, or breathing air in a sickroom or hospital ward, they could catch a disease. Since the 19th century, communicable diseases came to be viewed as being caused by germs/microbes.

The modern word "immunity" derives from the Latin immunis, meaning exemption from military service, tax payments or other public services.

The first scientist who developed a full theory of immunity was Ilya Mechnikov who revealed phagocytosis in 1882. With Louis Pasteur's germ theory of disease, the fledgling science of immunology began to explain how bacteria caused disease, and how, following infection, the human body gained the ability to resist further infections.

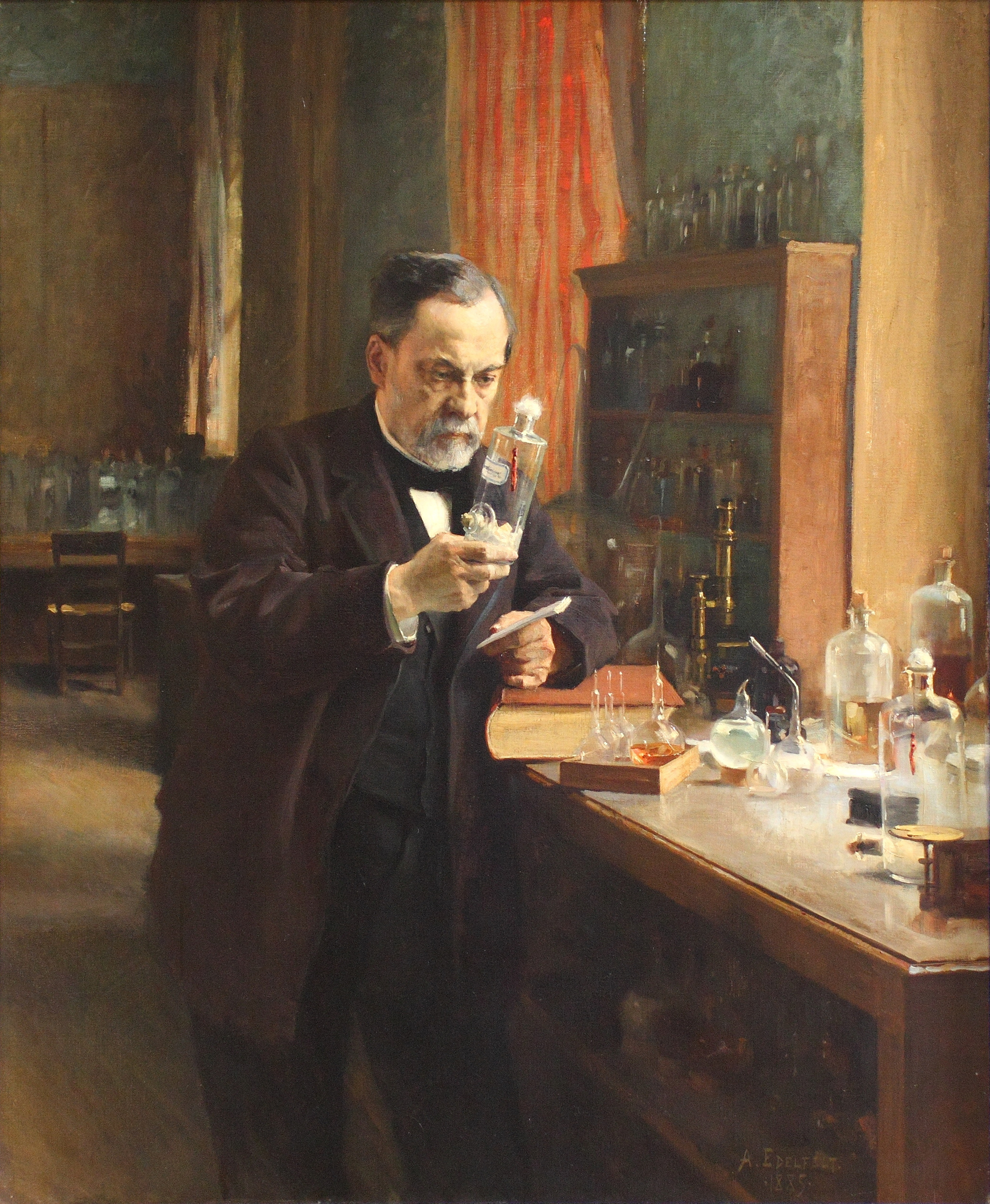
Louis Pasteur in his laboratory, 1885, by Albert Edelfelt

In 1888 Emile Roux and Alexandre Yersin isolated diphtheria toxin, and following the 1890 discovery by Behring and Kitasato of antitoxin based immunity to diphtheria and tetanus, the antitoxin became the first major success of modern therapeutic immunology.

In Europe, the induction of active immunity emerged in an attempt to contain smallpox. Immunization has existed in various forms for at least a thousand years, without the terminology. The earliest use of immunization is unknown, but, about 1000 AD, the Chinese began practicing a form of immunization by drying and inhaling powders derived from the crusts of smallpox lesions. Around the 15th century in India, the Ottoman Empire, and east Africa, the practice of inoculation (poking the skin with powdered material derived from smallpox crusts) was quite common. This practice was first introduced into the west in 1721 by Lady Mary Wortley Montagu. In 1798, Edward Jenner introduced the far safer method of deliberate infection with cowpox virus, (smallpox vaccine), which caused a mild infection that also induced immunity to smallpox. By 1800, the procedure was referred to as vaccination. To avoid confusion, smallpox inoculation was increasingly referred to as variolation, and it became common practice to use this term without regard for chronology. The success and general acceptance of Jenner's procedure would later drive the general nature of vaccination developed by Pasteur and others towards the end of the 19th century. In 1891, Pasteur widened the definition of vaccine in honour of Jenner, and it then became essential to qualify the term by referring to polio vaccine, measles vaccine etc.

== Passive immunity ==
Passive immunity is the immunity acquired by the transfer of ready-made antibodies from one individual to another. Passive immunity can occur naturally, such as when maternal antibodies are transferred to the foetus through the placenta, and can also be induced artificially, when high levels of human (or horse) antibodies specific for a pathogen or toxin are transferred to non-immune individuals. Passive immunization is used when there is a high risk of infection and insufficient time for the body to develop its own immune response, or to reduce the symptoms of ongoing or immunosuppressive diseases. Passive immunity provides immediate protection, but the body does not develop memory, therefore the patient is at risk of being infected by the same pathogen later.

=== Naturally acquired passive immunity ===
A fetus naturally acquires passive immunity from its mother during pregnancy. Maternal passive immunity is antibody-mediated immunity. The mother's antibodies (MatAb) are passed through the placenta to the fetus by an FcRn receptor on placental cells. This occurs around the third month of gestation. IgG is the only antibody isotype that can pass through the placenta.

Passive immunity is also provided through the transfer of IgA antibodies found in breast milk that are transferred to the gut of a nursing infant, protecting against bacterial infections, until the newborn can synthesize its antibodies. Colostrum present in mothers milk is an example of passive immunity.

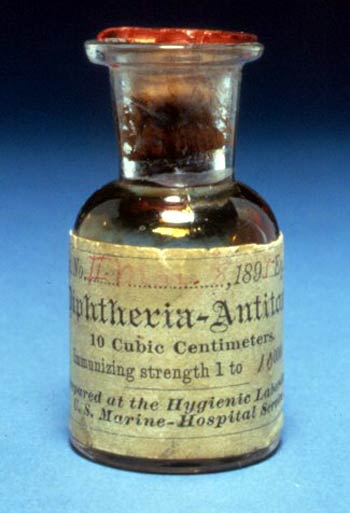
One of the first bottles of diphtheria antitoxin produced (dated 1895)

=== Artificially acquired passive immunity ===
Artificially acquired passive immunity is a short-term immunization induced by the transfer of antibodies, which can be administered in several forms; as human or animal blood plasma, as pooled human immunoglobulin for intravenous (IVIG) or intramuscular (IG) use, and in the form of monoclonal antibodies (MAb). Passive transfer is used prophylactically in the case of immunodeficiency diseases, such as hypogammaglobulinemia. It is also used in the treatment of several types of acute infection, and to treat poisoning. Immunity derived from passive immunization lasts for only a short period of time, and there is also a potential risk for hypersensitivity reactions, and serum sickness, especially from gamma globulin of non-human origin.

The artificial induction of passive immunity has been used for over a century to treat infectious disease, and before the advent of antibiotics, was often the only specific treatment for certain infections. Immunoglobulin therapy continued to be a first line therapy in the treatment of severe respiratory diseases until the 1930s, even after sulfonamide lot antibiotics were introduced.

=== Transfer of activated T-cells ===
Passive or "adoptive transfer" of cell-mediated immunity, is conferred by the transfer of "sensitized" or activated T-cells from one individual into another. It is rarely used in humans because it requires histocompatible (matched) donors, which are often difficult to find. In unmatched donors this type of transfer carries severe risks of graft versus host disease. It has, however, been used to treat certain diseases including some types of cancer and immunodeficiency. This type of transfer differs from a bone marrow transplant, in which (undifferentiated) hematopoietic stem cells are transferred.

== Active immunity ==
The time course of an immune response. Due to the formation of immunological memory, reinfection at later time points leads to a rapid increase in antibody production and effector T cell activity. These later infections can be mild or even unapparent.

When B cells and T cells are activated by a pathogen, memory B-cells and T- cells develop, and the primary immune response results. Throughout the lifetime of an animal, these memory cells will "remember" each specific pathogen encountered, and can mount a strong secondary response if the pathogen is detected again. The primary and secondary responses were first described in 1921 by English immunologist Alexander Glenny although the mechanism involved was not discovered until later. This type of immunity is both active and adaptive because the body's immune system prepares itself for future challenges. Active immunity often involves both the cell-mediated and humoral aspects of immunity as well as input from the innate immune system.

=== Naturally acquired ===
Naturally acquired active immunity occurs as the result of surviving an infection. When a person is exposed to a live pathogen and develops a primary immune response, this leads to immunological memory. Many disorders of immune system function can affect the formation of active immunity, such as immunodeficiency (both acquired and congenital forms) and immunosuppression.

=== Artificially acquired ===
Artificially acquired active immunity can be induced by a vaccine, a substance that contains antigen. A vaccine stimulates a primary response against the antigen without causing symptoms of the disease. The term vaccination was coined by Richard Dunning, a colleague of Edward Jenner, and adapted by Louis Pasteur for his pioneering work in vaccination. The method Pasteur used entailed treating the infectious agents for those diseases, so they lost the ability to cause serious disease. Pasteur adopted the name vaccine as a generic term in honor of Jenner's discovery, which Pasteur's work built upon.

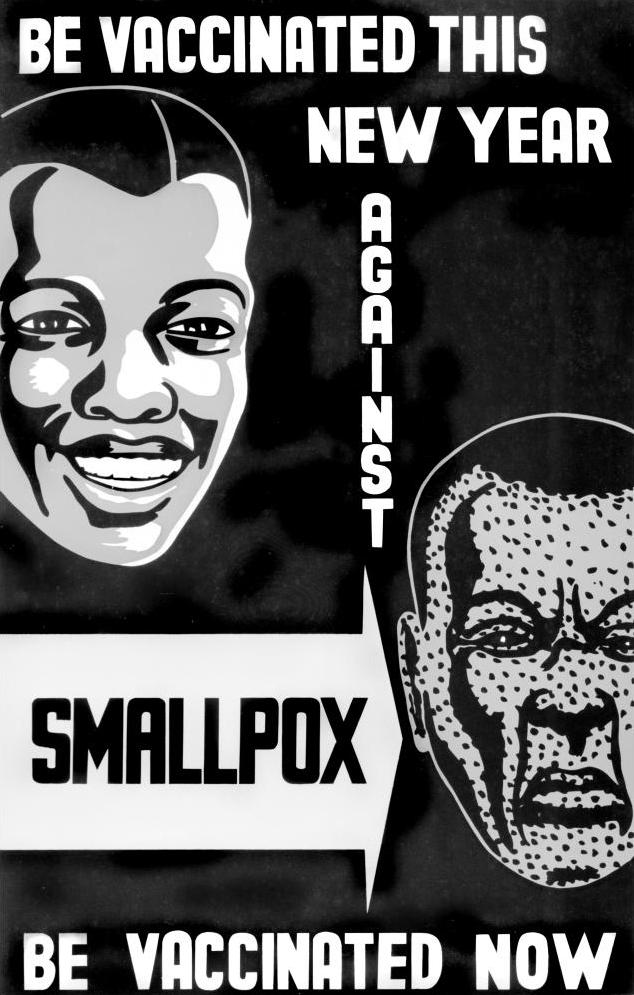
Poster from before the 1979 eradication of smallpox, promoting vaccination

In 1807, Bavaria became the first group to require their military recruits to be vaccinated against smallpox, as the spread of smallpox was linked to combat. Subsequently, the practice of vaccination would increase with the spread of war.

There are four types of traditional vaccines:

- Inactivated vaccines are composed of micro-organisms that have been killed with chemicals and/or heat and are no longer infectious. Examples are vaccines against flu, cholera, plague, and hepatitis A. Most vaccines of this type are likely to require booster shots.
- Live, attenuated vaccines are composed of micro-organisms that have been cultivated under conditions which disable their ability to induce disease. These responses are more durable, however, they may require booster shots. Examples include yellow fever, measles, rubella, and mumps.
- Toxoids are inactivated toxic compounds from micro-organisms in cases where these (rather than the micro-organism itself) cause illness, used prior to an encounter with the toxin of the micro-organism. Examples of toxoid-based vaccines include tetanus and diphtheria.
- Subunit, recombinant, polysaccharide, and conjugate vaccines are composed of small fragments or pieces from a pathogenic (disease-causing) organism. A characteristic example is the subunit vaccine against Hepatitis B virus.

In addition, there are some newer types of vaccines in use:

- Outer Membrane Vesicle (OMV) vaccines contain the outer membrane of a bacterium without any of its internal components or genetic material. Thus, ideally, they stimulate an immune response effective against the original bacteria without the risk of an infection.
- Genetic vaccines deliver nucleic acid that codes for an antigen into host cells, which then produce that antigen, stimulating an immune response. This category of vaccine includes DNA vaccines, RNA vaccines, and viral vector vaccines, which differ in the chemical form of nucleic acid and how it is delivered into host cells.

A variety of vaccine types are under development; see Experimental Vaccine Types.

Most vaccines are given by hypodermic or intramuscular injection as they are not absorbed reliably through the gut. Live attenuated polio and some typhoid and cholera vaccines are given orally in order to produce immunity based in the bowel.

=== Hybrid immunity ===
Hybrid immunity is the combination of natural immunity and artificial immunity. Studies of hybrid-immune people found that their blood was better able to neutralize the Beta and other variants of SARS-CoV-2 than never-infected, vaccinated people. Moreover, on 29 October 2021, the Centers for Disease Control and Prevention (CDC) concluded that "Multiple studies in different settings have consistently shown that infection with SARS-CoV-2 and vaccination each result in a low risk of subsequent infection with antigenically similar variants for at least 6 months. Numerous immunologic studies and a growing number of epidemiologic studies have shown that vaccinating previously infected individuals significantly enhances their immune response and effectively reduces the risk of subsequent infection, including in the setting of increased circulation of more infectious variants. ..."

== Genetics ==
Immunity is determined genetically. Genomes in humans and animals encode the antibodies and numerous other immune response genes. While many of these genes are generally required for active and passive immune responses (see sections above), there are also many genes that appear to be required for very specific immune responses. For instance, Tumor Necrosis Factor (TNF) is required for defense of tuberculosis in humans. Individuals with genetic defects in TNF may get recurrent and life-threatening infections with tuberculosis bacteria (Mycobacterium tuberculosis) but are otherwise healthy. They also seem to respond to other infections more or less normally. The condition is therefore called Mendelian susceptibility to mycobacterial disease (MSMD) and variants of it can be caused by other genes related to interferon production or signaling (e.g. by mutations in the genes IFNG, IL12B, IL12RB1, IL12RB2, IL23R, ISG15, MCTS1, RORC, TBX21, TYK2, CYBB, JAK1, IFNGR1, IFNGR2, STAT1, USP18, IRF1, IRF8, NEMO, SPPL2A).

== See also ==
- Antiserum
- Antivenin
- Cell-mediated immunity
- Herd immunity
- Heterosubtypic immunity
- Hoskins effect
- Humoral immunity
- Immunology
- Inoculation
- Premunity
- Vaccine-naive
- Virgin soil epidemic
