= Interleukin 23 =

Heterodimeric cytokine acting as mediator of inflammation

IL12B
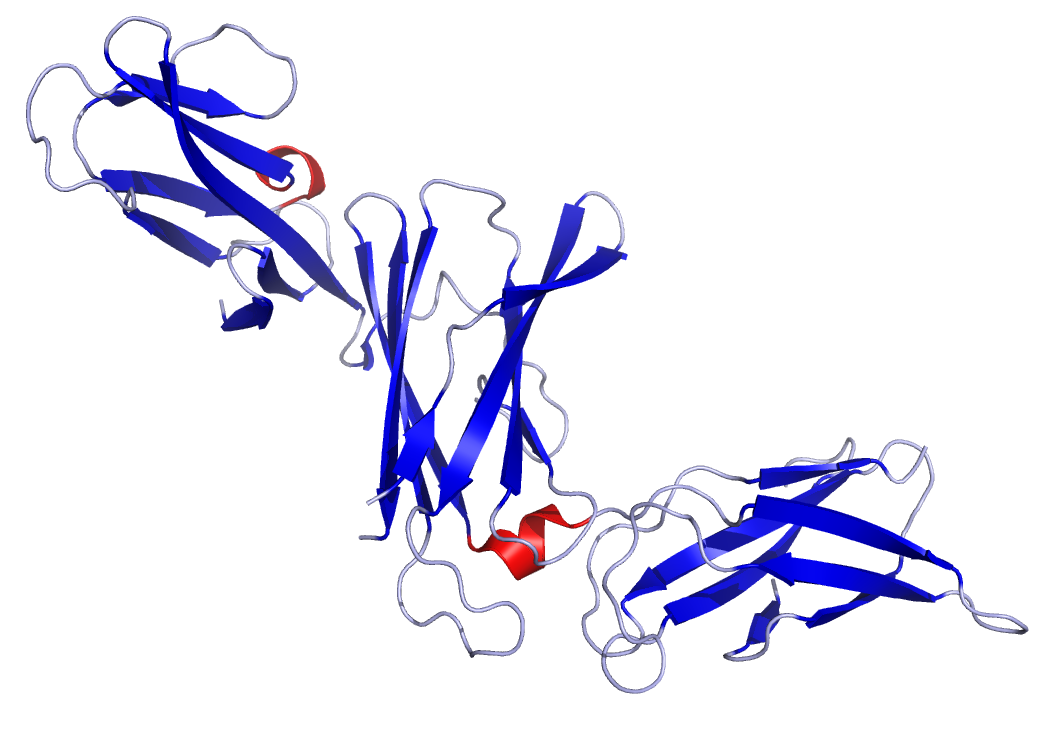
- Crystal structure of IL-12B

Identifiers
- Symbol: IL12B
- Alt. symbols: CLMF2, NKSF2, p40
- NCBI gene: 3593
- HGNC: 5970
- OMIM: 161561
- PDB: 1F42
- RefSeq: NM_002187
- UniProt: P29460

Other data
- Locus: Chr. 5 q31.1-33.1
Search for
- Structures: Swiss-model
- Domains: InterPro

interleukin 23, alpha subunit p19

Identifiers
- Symbol: IL23A
- NCBI gene: 51561
- HGNC: 15488
- RefSeq: NM_016584
- UniProt: Q9NPF7

Other data
- Locus: Chr. 12 q13.13
Search for
- Structures: Swiss-model
- Domains: InterPro

Interleukin 23 (IL-23) is a heterodimeric cytokine composed of an IL-12B (IL-12p40) subunit (which is shared with IL-12) and an IL-23A (IL-23p19) subunit. IL-23 is part of the IL-12 family of cytokines. The functional receptor for IL-23 (the IL-23 receptor) consists of a heterodimer between IL-12Rβ1 and IL-23R.

== Discovery ==
IL-23 was discovered in the year 2000 by Robert Kastelein and colleagues at the DNAX research institute using a combination of computational, biochemical and cellular immunology approaches.

== Function ==
IL-23 is an inflammatory cytokine. It has been shown to be a key cytokine for T helper type 17 cell (Th17 cell) maintenance and expansion. Polarisation to a Th17 phenotype is triggered by IL-6 and TGF-β, which activate the Th17 transcription factor RORγt. IL-23 stabilises RORγt and thus enables Th17 cells to release their effector cytokines, such as IL-17, IL-21, IL-22 and GM-CSF, which mediate protection against extracellular fungi and bacteria and participate in barrier immunity. Effects similar to those IL-23 has on Th17 cells were described for type 3 innate lymphoid cells, which actively secrete Th17 cytokines upon IL-23 stimulation. Natural killer cells also express the IL-23 receptor. They respond with increased interferon-γ secretion and enhanced antibody-dependent cellular cytotoxicity. IL-23 also induces proliferation of CD4 memory T cells (but not naïve T cells). Besides its proinflammatory effects, IL-23 promotes angiogenesis.

IL-23 is mainly secreted by activated dendritic cells, macrophages or monocytes. Innate lymphoid cells and γδ T cells also produce IL-23. B cells produce IL-23 through B cell antigen receptor signaling. Secretion is stimulated by an antigen stimulus recognised by a pattern recognition receptor. IL-23 imbalance and increase is associated with autoimmune diseases and cancer. It is thus a target for therapeutic research. IL-23 expression by dendritic cells is further induced by thymic stromal lymphopoietin, a proallergic cytokine expressed by keratinocytes that is elevated in psoriatic lesions. In the pathogenesis of psoriasis, dermal dendritic cells are stimulated to release IL-23 by nociceptive neurons. IL-23 is also elevated during bacterial meningitis, leading to epithelial dysregulation and inflammation.

Mycobacterium avium subspecies paratuberculosis-stimulated monocyte-derived macrophages are one of the contributors of IL-23, and thus cattle with Johne's disease have elevated IL-23.

Prior to the discovery of IL-23, IL-12 had been proposed to represent a key mediator of inflammation in mouse models of inflammation. However, many studies aimed at assessing the role of IL-12 by pharmacological blockade had targeted IL-12B, and were therefore not as specific as thought. Studies which blocked the function of IL-12A did not produce the same results as those targeting IL-12B, as would have been expected if both subunits formed part of IL-12 only.

The discovery of an additional potential binding partner for IL-12B led to a reassessment of this role for IL-12. Studies in experimental autoimmune encephalomyelitis, a mouse model of multiple sclerosis, showed that IL-23 was responsible for the inflammation observed, not IL-12 as previously thought. Subsequently, IL-23 was shown to facilitate development of inflammation in numerous other models of immune pathology where IL-12 had previously been implicated, including models of arthritis, intestinal inflammation, and psoriasis. Low concentrations of IL-23 support lung tumor growth whereas high concentrations inhibit proliferation of lung cancer cells. IL-23 and IL-23R were identified in serum from patients with non-small-cell lung cancer and have been proposed as prognostic serum markers. IL-23 can also promote progression of cardiovascular diseases such as atherosclerosis, hypertension, aortic dissection, cardiac hypertrophy, myocardial infarction and acute cardiac injury. In brain, IL-23 is able to activate γδ T cells to increase their expression of IL-17, which contributes to the inflammatory response and thus plays a key role in secondary brain injury after spontaneous intracerebral hemorrhage.

=== Monoclonal antibody drugs ===
IL-23 is one of the therapeutic targets to treat the inflammatory diseases. Blocking IL-23 can slow clinical manifestation of psoriasis, indirectly affecting Th17 immune response and production of IL-17. Ustekinumab, a monoclonal antibody directed against this cytokine, is used to treat certain autoimmune conditions. Guselkumab is another monoclonal antibody against IL-23. Ixekizumab, an IL-17A antagonist, has been reported to have faster onset of action in treatment of psoriasis than tildrakizumab or risankizumab, which are inhibitors of the p19 subunit of IL-23. However, guselkumab and risankizumab has been shown to have the best treatment results for psoriasis. Adnectin-2 binds to IL-23 and competes with IL-23–IL-23R binding.

== Signalling ==
The IL-23 heterodimer binds the receptor complex: the p19 subunit binds IL-23R while the p40 subunit binds IL-12RB1. Receptor binding leads to recruitment of Janus kinase 2 and Tyrosine kinase 2 kinases. Janus kinase 2 and Tyrosine kinase 2 transduce the signal and phosphorylate STAT3 and STAT4. STATs dimerise and activate transcription of target genes in nucleus. STAT3 is responsible for key Th17 development attributes such as RORγt expression and transcription of Th17 cytokines.
