= Interleukin 23 subunit alpha =

Mammalian protein found in Homo sapiens

IL23A
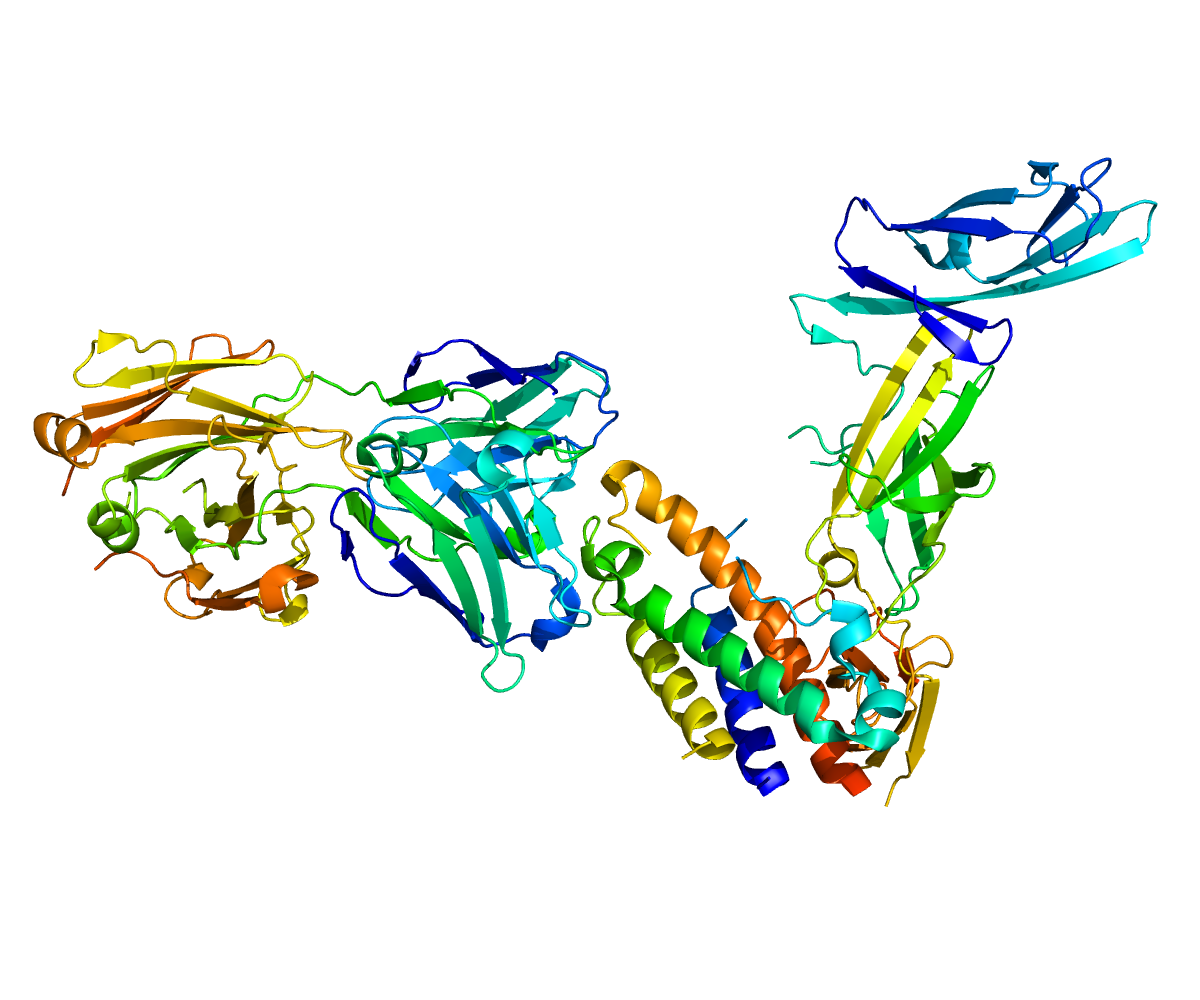
Available structures
PDB	Ortholog search: PDBe RCSB
PDB	List of PDB id codes 3D85, 3D87, 3DUH, 3QWR, 4GRW, 4OE8, 4OG9

Identifiers
- Aliases: IL23A, IL-23, IL-23A, IL23P19, P19, SGRF, Interleukin 23, interleukin 23 subunit alpha
- External IDs: OMIM: 605580; MGI: 1932410; HomoloGene: 12832; GeneCards: IL23A; OMA:IL23A - orthologs

Gene location (Human)
Chr.	Chromosome 12 (human)
Band	12q13.3	Start	56,334,174 bp
Band	12q13.3	End	56,340,410 bp

Gene location (Mouse)
Chr.	Chromosome 10 (mouse)
Band	10|10 D3	Start	128,132,008 bp
Band	10|10 D3	End	128,134,621 bp
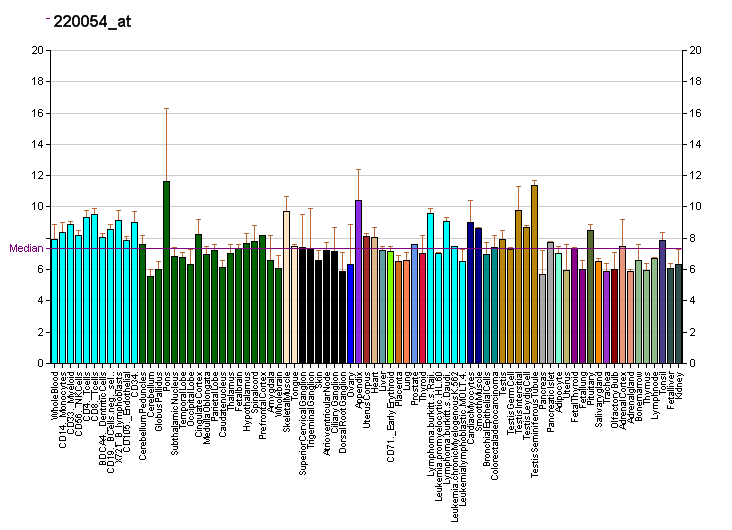
RNA expression pattern
Bgee	Human / Mouse (ortholog); Top expressed in: testicle; left testis; right testis; pancreatic ductal cell; granulocyte; sperm; cartilage tissue; gonad; oocyte; oral cavity / Top expressed in: secondary oocyte; morula; zygote; primary oocyte; decidua; atrioventricular valve; optic nerve; cumulus cell; endocardial cushion; embryo; More reference expression data
BioGPS	More reference expression data
Gene ontology
Molecular function	cytokine activity; interleukin-23 receptor binding; protein binding
Cellular component	interleukin-23 complex; extracellular region; extracellular space; endoplasmic reticulum lumen
Biological process	negative regulation of interleukin-10 production; positive regulation of inflammatory response; positive regulation of interleukin-12 production; positive regulation of interleukin-10 production; immune system process; positive regulation of T cell mediated cytotoxicity; positive regulation of interferon-gamma production; positive regulation of natural killer cell activation; positive regulation of osteoclast differentiation; positive regulation of T-helper 17 cell lineage commitment; positive regulation of NK T cell activation; T cell proliferation; positive regulation of natural killer cell proliferation; positive regulation of NK T cell proliferation; positive regulation of T-helper 17 type immune response; defense response to virus; positive regulation of tissue remodeling; positive regulation of T-helper 1 type immune response; positive regulation of granulocyte macrophage colony-stimulating factor production; defense response to Gram-negative bacterium; positive regulation of T cell proliferation; immune response; positive regulation of memory T cell differentiation; positive regulation of neutrophil chemotaxis; positive regulation of tumor necrosis factor production; positive regulation of interleukin-17 production; innate immune response; inflammatory response; tissue remodeling; positive regulation of transcription by RNA polymerase II; positive regulation of activated T cell proliferation; positive regulation of defense response to virus by host; positive regulation of activation of Janus kinase activity; regulation of tyrosine phosphorylation of STAT protein; positive regulation of tyrosine phosphorylation of STAT protein; regulation of signaling receptor activity; cytokine-mediated signaling pathway; interleukin-23-mediated signaling pathway; positive regulation of NIK/NF-kappaB signaling
Sources:Amigo / QuickGO
Orthologs
Species	Human	Mouse
Entrez	51561	83430
Ensembl	ENSG00000110944	ENSMUSG00000025383
UniProt	Q9NPF7	Q9EQ14
RefSeq (mRNA)	NM_016584	NM_031252
RefSeq (protein)	NP_057668	NP_112542
Location (UCSC)	Chr 12: 56.33 – 56.34 Mb	Chr 10: 128.13 – 128.13 Mb
PubMed search
- Wikidata
View/Edit Human	View/Edit Mouse

Interleukin-23 subunit alpha is a protein that in humans is encoded by the IL23A gene. The protein is also known as IL-23p19. It is one of the two subunits of the cytokine Interleukin-23.

Interleukin-23 (IL-23) is a heterodimeric cytokine composed of an Interleukin 23 alpha subunit and an IL-12p40 subunit. The IL-12p40, also known as Interleukin 12 subunit beta, is used by both IL-23 (where it partners with IL-23p19) and IL-12 (where it partners with IL-12A). A functional receptor for IL-23 (the IL-23 receptor) has been identified and is composed of IL-12R β1 and IL-23R.

== Function ==
Produced by dendritic cells and macrophages, IL-23 is an important part of the inflammatory response against infection. It promotes upregulation of the matrix metalloprotease MMP9, increases angiogenesis and reduces CD8+ T-cell infiltration into tumours. IL-23 mediates its effects on both innate and adaptive arms of the immune system that express the IL-23 receptor. T_{h}17 cells represent the most prominent T cell subset that responds to IL-23, although IL-23 has been implicated in inhibiting the development of regulatory T cell in the intestine. T_{h}17 cells produce IL-17, a proinflammatory cytokine that enhances T cell priming and stimulates the production of other proinflammatory molecules such as IL-1, IL-6, TNF-alpha, NOS-2, and chemokines resulting in inflammation.

The expression of IL23A is decreased after AHR knockdown in THP-1 cells and primary mouse macrophages.

== Clinical significance ==
Knockout mice deficient in either p40 or p19, or in either subunit of the IL-23 receptor (IL-23R and IL12R-β1) develop less severe symptoms of experimental autoimmune encephalomyelitis (EAE) and inflammatory bowel disease highlighting the importance of IL-23 in the inflammatory pathway.

== Discovery ==
A computational search for IL-12 homologue genes found p19, a gene that encodes a cytokine chain. Experimental work revealed that p19 formed a heterodimer by binding to p40, a subunit of IL-12. This new heterodimer was named IL-23.

Knockdown of AHR decreases the expression of IL23A in THP-1 cells and primary macrophage.

== Pharmacology ==
Several biologic drugs work by targeting IL-23A. Ustekinumab, a monoclonal antibody targeting both IL-12 and IL-23 and used to treat plaque psoriasis, psoriatic arthritis, and Crohn's disease, launched in the United States under the brand name Stelara. Risankizumab is another monoclonal antibody that targets IL-23A and is approved to treat plaque psoriasis, psoriatic arthritis, Crohn's disease, and ulcerative colitis.
