= Envudeucitinib =

Clinical data
- Other names: FTP-637

Identifiers
- IUPAC name: N-(4-{2-methoxy-3-[1-(trideuteriomethyl)-1H-1,2,4-triazol-3-yl]anilino}-5-(3,3,3-trideuteriopropanoyl)pyridin-2-yl)cyclopropanecarboxamide
- CAS Number: 2417135-66-9
- PubChem CID: 158715582
- IUPHAR/BPS: 13205
- UNII: KD2MDJ4GAB
- KEGG: D13123

Chemical and physical data
- Formula: C_{22}H_{18}D_{6}N_{6}O_{3}
- Molar mass: 426.506 g·mol^{−1}
- 3D model (JSmol): Interactive image
- SMILES: [2H]C([2H])([2H])CC(=O)c1cnc(NC(=O)C2CC2)cc1Nc1cccc(-c2ncn(C([2H])([2H])[2H])n2)c1OC
- InChI: InChI=InChI=1S/C22H24N6O3/c1-4-18(29)15-11-23-19(26-22(30)13-8-9-13)10-17(15)25-16-7-5-6-14(20(16)31-3)21-24-12-28(2)27-21/h5-7,10-13H,4,8-9H2,1-3H3,(H2,23,25,26,30)/i1D3,2D3; Key:FKCATCQHVCOBCX-WFGJKAKNSA-N

Envudeucitinib is an investigational new drug that is being evaluated for the treatment of psoriasis. It is a selective tyrosine kinase 2 (TYK2) inhibitor developed by Fronthera U.S. Pharmaceuticals LLC and now owned by Alumis, Inc. for the treatment of autoimmune diseases. Envudeucitinib targets the TYK2 signaling pathway, which plays a crucial role in regulating multiple pro-inflammatory cytokines such as IL-12, IL-23, and type I interferons.
