= IL-23 =

IL-23 or IL 23 can refer to:

- Interleukin 23, a protein
- Illinois's 23rd congressional district, an obsolete district
- Illinois Route 23
