= JNJ-77242113 =

JNJ-77242113 INN: Icotrokinra
Legal status
- Legal status: Investigational

Identifiers
- IUPAC name: (4S)-4-[[4-[[(2S)-2-[[(2S)-2-[[(4R,7S,10S,13S,16S,19R)-19-acetamido-7-(4-acetamidobutyl)-16-(2-amino-2-oxoethyl)-13-[(1R)-1-hydroxyethyl]-3,3,20,20-tetramethyl-10-[(7-methyl-1H-indol-3-yl)methyl]-6,9,12,15,18-pentaoxo-1,2-dithia-5,8,11,14,17-pentazacycloicosane-4-carbonyl]amino]-3-[4-(2-aminoethoxy)phenyl]propanoyl]amino]-3-naphthalen-2-ylpropanoyl]amino]oxane-4-carbonyl]amino]-5-[[(2S)-4-amino-1-[[(2S)-1-[(2-amino-2-oxoethyl)-methylamino]-1-oxo-3-pyridin-3-ylpropan-2-yl]amino]-1,4-dioxobutan-2-yl]amino]-5-oxopentanoic acid
- CAS Number: 2982273-99-2
- PubChem CID: 162462321
- ChemSpider: 129786698
- UNII: MUW8FP7HNZ
- KEGG: D13108

Chemical and physical data
- Formula: C_{90}H_{120}N_{20}O_{22}S_{2}
- Molar mass: 1898.19 g·mol^{−1}
- 3D model (JSmol): Interactive image
- SMILES: CC1=C2C(=CC=C1)C(=CN2)C[C@H]3C(=O)N[C@H](C(=O)N[C@@H](C(SSC([C@@H](C(=O)N[C@H](C(=O)N[C@H](C(=O)N3)[C@@H](C)O)CC(=O)N)NC(=O)C)(C)C)(C)C)C(=O)N[C@@H](CC4=CC=C(C=C4)OCCN)C(=O)N[C@@H](CC5=CC6=CC=CC=C6C=C5)C(=O)NC7(CCOCC7)C(=O)N[C@@H](CCC(=O)O)C(=O)N[C@@H](CC(=O)N)C(=O)N[C@@H](CC8=CN=CC=C8)C(=O)N(C)CC(=O)N)CCCCNC(=O)C
- InChI: InChI=1S/C90H120N20O22S2/c1-48-16-14-20-59-57(46-97-72(48)59)42-64-79(122)99-60(21-12-13-34-96-50(3)112)77(120)108-75(89(7,8)134-133-88(5,6)74(98-51(4)113)84(127)104-66(44-69(93)115)81(124)107-73(49(2)111)83(126)102-64)85(128)103-62(39-52-23-26-58(27-24-52)132-37-32-91)78(121)100-63(40-53-22-25-55-18-10-11-19-56(55)38-53)82(125)109-90(30-35-131-36-31-90)87(130)106-61(28-29-71(117)118)76(119)101-65(43-68(92)114)80(123)105-67(41-54-17-15-33-95-45-54)86(129)110(9)47-70(94)116/h10-11,14-20,22-27,33,38,45-46,49,60-67,73-75,97,111H,12-13,21,28-32,34-37,39-44,47,91H2,1-9H3,(H2,92,114)(H2,93,115)(H2,94,116)(H,96,112)(H,98,113)(H,99,122)(H,100,121)(H,101,119)(H,102,126)(H,103,128)(H,104,127)(H,105,123)(H,106,130)(H,107,124)(H,108,120)(H,109,125)(H,117,118)/t49-,60+,61+,62+,63+,64+,65+,66+,67+,73+,74-,75-/m1/s1; Key:IVFNYXYPMJQSGF-QMRCQSNESA-N

JNJ-77242113 is an experimental peptide and orally administered interleukin-23 receptor antagonist that was developed to treat psoriasis.
