= SPPL2B =

Protein-coding gene in humans

Identifiers
- Aliases: SPPL2B, IMP-4, IMP4, PSH4, PSL1, signal peptide peptidase like 2B
- External IDs: OMIM: 608239; MGI: 1920468; GeneCards: SPPL2B

Gene location (Human)
Chr.	Chromosome 19 (human)
Band	19p13.3	Start	2,328,615 bp
Band	19p13.3	End	2,355,095 bp

Gene location (Mouse)
Chr.	Chromosome 10 (mouse)
Band	10|10 C1	Start	80,691,109 bp
Band	10|10 C1	End	80,704,542 bp
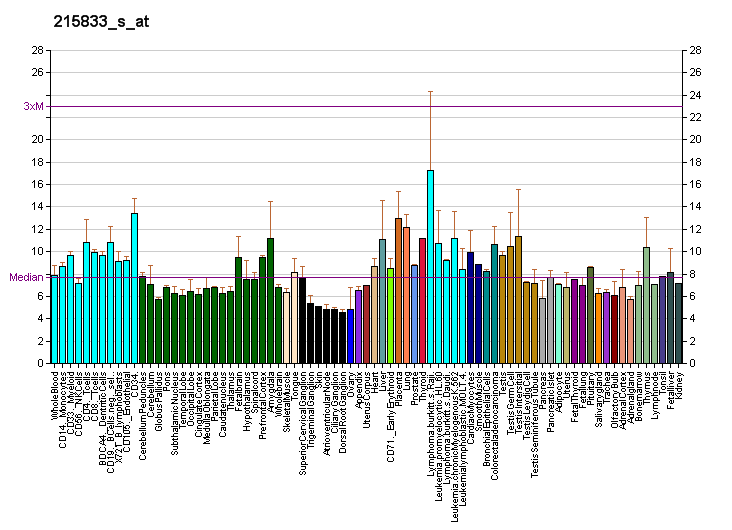

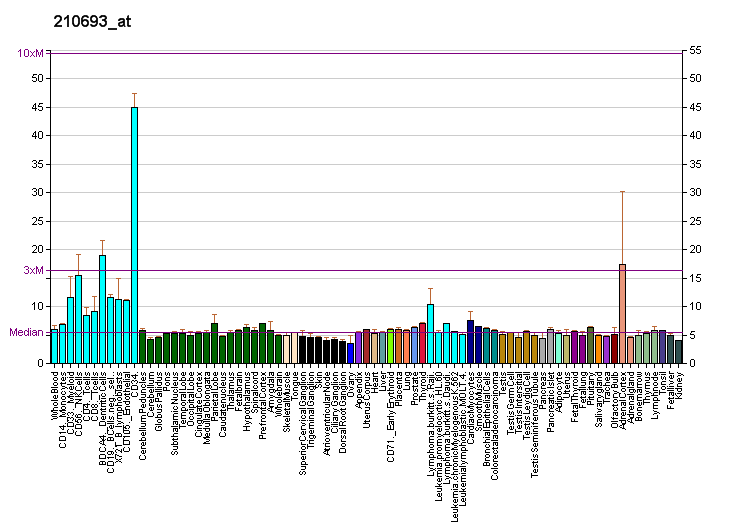
RNA expression pattern
Bgee	Human / Mouse (ortholog); Top expressed in: right uterine tube; anterior pituitary; left testis; right testis; right hemisphere of cerebellum; transverse colon; right lobe of thyroid gland; body of pancreas; left lobe of thyroid gland; mucosa of transverse colon / Top expressed in: spermatocyte; fetal liver hematopoietic progenitor cell; spermatid; motor neuron; saccule; neural layer of retina; otic vesicle; otic placode; external carotid artery; Rostral migratory stream; More reference expression data
BioGPS	More reference expression data
Gene ontology
Molecular function	protein homodimerization activity; aspartic-type endopeptidase activity; peptidase activity; protein binding; hydrolase activity; aspartic endopeptidase activity, intramembrane cleaving
Cellular component	integral component of membrane; endosome; centrosome; Golgi apparatus; membrane; integral component of cytoplasmic side of endoplasmic reticulum membrane; Golgi membrane; nucleoplasm; lysosomal membrane; actin cytoskeleton; Golgi-associated vesicle membrane; lysosome; integral component of lumenal side of endoplasmic reticulum membrane; endosome membrane; plasma membrane
Biological process	membrane protein proteolysis; proteolysis; membrane protein ectodomain proteolysis; membrane protein intracellular domain proteolysis; regulation of immune response; regulation of tumor necrosis factor-mediated signaling pathway
Sources:Amigo / QuickGO
Orthologs
Databases	NCBI: entry; OMA: entry
Species	Human	Mouse
Entrez	56928	73218
Ensembl	ENSG00000005206	ENSMUSG00000035206
UniProt	Q8TCT7	Q3TD49
RefSeq (mRNA)	NM_001077238; NM_152988	NM_175195; NM_001358803; NM_001358804
RefSeq (protein)	NP_001070706; NP_694533	NP_780404; NP_001345732; NP_001345733
Location (UCSC)	Chr 19: 2.33 – 2.36 Mb	Chr 10: 80.69 – 80.7 Mb
PubMed search
- Wikidata
View/Edit Human	View/Edit Mouse

Signal peptide peptidase-like 2B, also known as SPPL2B, is a human gene.

== Gene ==
Multiple transcript variants encoding different isoforms have been found for this gene.

== Subcellular distribution ==
This enzyme localizes to endosomes, lysosomes, and the plasma membrane.

== Structure ==
This gene is a member of the signal peptide peptidase-like protease (SPPL) family with the conserved active site motifs 'YD' and 'GxGD' in adjacent transmembrane domains (TMDs).

== Function ==
This protein plays a role in innate and adaptive immunity by cleaving TNFα in activated dendritic cells. SPPL2b also modulates APP cleavage and Aβ production.
