= Interleukin-12 receptor =

Type I cytokine receptor

interleukin 12 receptor, beta 1

Identifiers
- Symbol: IL12RB1
- Alt. symbols: IL12RB, CD212
- NCBI gene: 3594
- HGNC: 5971
- OMIM: 601604
- RefSeq: NM_005535
- UniProt: P42701

Other data
- Locus: Chr. 19 p13.1
Search for
- Structures: Swiss-model
- Domains: InterPro

beta 2 subunit, interleukin 12 receptor, beta 2

Identifiers
- Symbol: IL12RB2
- NCBI gene: 3595
- HGNC: 5972
- OMIM: 601642
- RefSeq: NM_001559
- UniProt: Q99665

Other data
- Locus: Chr. 1 p31.3-31.2
Search for
- Structures: Swiss-model
- Domains: InterPro

Interleukin 12 receptor is a type I cytokine receptor, binding interleukin 12 and consisting of beta 1 and beta 2 subunits.
