= Experimental autoimmune encephalomyelitis =

Animal model of brain inflammation

Experimental autoimmune encephalomyelitis, sometimes experimental allergic encephalomyelitis (EAE), is an animal model of brain inflammation. It is an inflammatory demyelinating disease of the central nervous system (CNS). It is mostly used with rodents and is widely studied as an animal model of the human CNS demyelinating diseases, including multiple sclerosis (MS) and acute disseminated encephalomyelitis (ADEM). EAE is also the prototype for T-cell-mediated autoimmune disease in general.

EAE development was motivated by observations during the convalescence from viral diseases by Thomas M. Rivers, D. H. Sprunt and G. P. Berry in 1933. Their findings upon a transfer of inflamed patient tissue to primates was published in the Journal of Experimental Medicine. An acute monophasic illness, it has been suggested that EAE is far more similar to ADEM than to MS.

== Types of EAE ==
EAE can be induced in a number of species, including mice, rats, guinea pigs, rabbits and primates.

The most commonly used antigens in rodents are spinal cord homogenate (SCH), purified myelin, myelin protein such as MBP, PLP, and MOG, or peptides of these proteins, all resulting in distinct models with different disease characteristics regarding both immunology and pathology. It may also be induced by the passive transfer of T cells specifically reactive to these myelin antigens.

Depending on the antigen used and the genetic make-up of the animal, rodents can display a monophasic bout of EAE, a relapsing-remitting form, or chronic EAE. The typical susceptible rodent will debut with clinical symptoms around two weeks after immunization and present with a relapsing-remitting disease. The archetypical first clinical symptom is weakness of tail tonus that progresses to paralysis of the tail, followed by a progression up the body to affect the hind limbs and finally the forelimbs.

However, similar to MS, the disease symptoms reflect the anatomical location of the inflammatory lesions, and may also include emotional lability, sensory loss, optic neuritis, difficulties with coordination and balance (ataxia), and muscle weakness and spasms. Recovery from symptoms can be complete or partial and the time varies with symptoms and disease severity. Depending on the relapse-remission intervals, rats can have up to three bouts of disease within an experimental period.

== In mice ==
Demyelination is produced by injection of brain extracts, CNS proteins (such as myelin basic protein), or peptides from such protein emulsified in an adjuvant such as complete Freund's adjuvant. The presence of the adjuvant allows the generation of inflammatory responses to the protein/peptides. In many protocols, mice are coinjected with pertussis toxin to break down the blood-brain barrier and allow immune cells access to the CNS tissue. This immunisation leads to multiple small disseminated lesions of demyelination (as well as micro-necroses) in the brain and spinal cord and the onset of clinical symptoms.

Although sharing some features, mostly demyelination, this model, first introduced in the 1930s, differs from human MS in several ways. EAE either kills animals or leaves them with permanent disabilities; animals with EAE also suffer severe nerve inflammation, and the time course of EAE is entirely different from MS, being the main antigen (MBP) in charge. Some key differences between EAE in mice, and MS in humans include:

- B-cells: Some research points to anti-CD20 B-cells being the basis of the autoimmune attacks. This has been shown to be completely different in EAE and MS.
- oxidative injury: Mitochondrial injury is seen in EAE and MS, but mitochondrial gene deletions have so far only been detected in MS lesions.
- microglia behaviour: In contrast to experimental models of inflammatory demyelination, lesion formation in multiple sclerosis occurs on a background of pro-inflammatory microglia activation, which is seen already in the normal white matter of age-matched controls, and this may contribute to neurodegeneration in the disease.
- pathological patterns: EAE is unable to reproduce MS pathological patterns III and IV.

=== Secondary damage ===
Given that some conditions as MS show cortical damage together with the WM damage, there has been interest if this can appear as a secondary damage of the WM.

=== Human Anti-MOG in mice ===
Anti-MOG associated encephalomyelitis can be passed from humans to mice, inducing MS type II demyelination (pattern II)

=== Immunogenetic interactions ===
Deficiency of TBX21 or STAT4 provides resistance against EAE, while interferon-γ-, interferon-γ-receptor-, interleukin-12 subunit α-, interleukin 12 receptor, β 2 subunit-, and interleukin 18-deficiency exacerbated disease.

== In humans ==
Sometimes the human equivalent to EAE has been triggered in humans by accident or medical mistake. The reactions have been diverse according to the sources of the disease The researchers in the last report have termed the condition "human autoimmune encephalitis" (HAE).

The damage in the second report fulfilled all pathological diagnostic criteria of MS and can therefore be classified as MS in its own right. The lesions were classified as pattern II in the Lucchinetti system. This case of human EAE also showed Dawson fingers.

Using the confluent demyelination as barrier between MS and ADEM, some other reports about EAE in humans classify its effects as ADEM but not always. In Japanese patients exposed to rabies vaccine that contained neural tissue, the clinical presentation resembled ADEM more than MS but the lesions were like acute multiple sclerosis (Uchimura and Shiraki, 1957).

=== Anti-TNF demyelination ===
Recent problems with monoclonal antibodies point to an involvement of tumor necrosis factor alpha in the multiple sclerosis onset. Specifically, a monoclonal antibody against TNF-α (adalimumab) has been reported to induce a MS-like disease

Also some experimental therapies for other diseases have produced MS artificially in patients. Specifically, monoclonal antibodies treating cancer like pembrolizumab and infliximab have been reported to produce MS artificially.

== Specific forms of EAE ==
Since the discovery of the four lucchinetti patterns, new EAE models have been published, specifically mimicking the patterns I and II. DTH-EAE for pattern I (T cell and macrophage-mediated delayed-type hypersensitivity) and fMOG-EAE for pattern II (antibody-mediated focal myelin oligodendrocyte glycoprotein-induced experimental autoimmune encephalitis)

Also a model for pattern III lesions has been developed in which mitochondrial metabolism is impaired, resulting in a tissue energy deficiency, a mechanism later termed "virtual hypoxia". The demyelination, characterized by loss of myelin-associated glycoprotein, has been described as "hypoxia-like". Thanks to these pattern III models some specific experimental treatments have appeared

The model for primary progressive MS is the Theiler's virus model. This model presents features not available in others, like microglial activation.

== Alternatives ==
Recently it has been found that CSF from MS patients can carry the disease to rodents, opening the door to an alternative model.

Meningoencephalitis of unknown origin (MUO) in dogs shares some similarities
