= Signal peptide peptidase =

Peptidase_A22B

Identifiers
- Symbol: Peptidase_A22B
- Pfam: PF04258
- Pfam clan: CL0130
- InterPro: IPR007369
- MEROPS: A22
Available protein structures:
- PDB: IPR007369 PF04258 (ECOD; PDBsum)
- AlphaFold: IPR007369; PF04258

Peptidase_A24

Identifiers
- Symbol: Peptidase_A24
- Pfam: PF01478
- Pfam clan: CL0130
- InterPro: IPR000045
- MEROPS: A24
- OPM superfamily: 244
- OPM protein: 3s0x
Available protein structures:
- PDB: IPR000045 PF01478 (ECOD; PDBsum)
- AlphaFold: IPR000045; PF01478

In molecular biology, the Signal Peptide Peptidase (SPP) is a type of protein that specifically cleaves parts of other proteins. It is an intramembrane aspartyl protease with the conserved active site motifs 'YD' and 'GxGD' in adjacent transmembrane domains (TMDs). Its sequences is highly conserved in different vertebrate species. SPP cleaves remnant signal peptides left behind in membrane by the action of signal peptidase and also plays key roles in immune surveillance and the maturation of certain viral proteins.

== Biological function ==
Physiologically SPP processes signal peptides of classical MHC class I preproteins. A nine amino acid-long cleavage fragment is then presented on HLA-E receptors and modulates the activity of natural killer cells.

SPP also plays a pathophysiological role; it cleaves the structural nucleocapsid protein (also known as core protein) of the Hepatitis C virus and thus influences viral reproduction rate.

In mice, a nonamer peptide originating from the SPP protein serves as minor histocompatibility antigen HM13 that plays a role in transplant rejection

The homologous proteases SPPL2A and SPPL2B promote the intramembrane cleavage of TNFα in activated dendritic cells and might play an immunomodulatory role. For SPPL2c and SPPL3 no substrates are known.

SPPs do not require cofactors as demonstrated by expression in bacteria and purification of a proteolytically active form. The C-terminal region defines the functional domain, which is in itself sufficient for proteolytic activity.

== Type IV leader peptidase ==
Another family of signal aspartic endopeptidases was found in bacteria. Bacteria produce a number of protein precursors that undergo post-translational methylation and proteolysis prior to secretion as active proteins. Type IV prepilin leader peptidases are enzymes that mediate this type of post-translational modification. Type IV pilin is a protein found on the surface of Pseudomonas aeruginosa, Neisseria gonorrhoeae and other Gram-negative pathogens. Pilin subunits attach the infecting organism to the surface of host epithelial cells. They are synthesised as prepilin subunits, which differ from mature pilin by virtue of containing a 6-8 residue leader peptide consisting of charged amino acids. Mature type IV pilins also contain a methylated N-terminal phenylalanine residue.

The bifunctional enzyme prepilin peptidase (PilD) from Pseudomonas aeruginosa is a key determinant in both type-IV pilus biogenesis and extracellular protein secretion, in its roles as a leader peptidase and methyl transferase (MTase). It is responsible for endopeptidic cleavage of the unique leader peptides that characterise type-IV pilin precursors, as well as proteins with homologous leader sequences that are essential components of the general secretion pathway found in a variety of Gram-negative pathogens. Following removal of the leader peptides, the same enzyme is responsible for the second posttranslational modification that characterises the type-IV pilins and their homologues, namely N-methylation of the newly exposed N-terminal amino acid residue.

== See also ==
- Leader peptidase A
- Presenilin
