= HM13 =

Protein-coding gene in the species Homo sapiens

Identifiers
- Aliases: HM13, H13, IMP1, IMPAS, IMPAS-1, MSTP086, PSENL3, PSL3, SPP, SPPL1, dJ324O17.1, histocompatibility (minor) 13, histocompatibility minor 13
- External IDs: OMIM: 607106; MGI: 95886; GeneCards: HM13
Available structures
PDB	Ortholog search: PDBe RCSB
PDB	List of PDB id codes 1INQ, 1JUF

Gene location (Human)
Chr.	Chromosome 20 (human)
Band	20q11.21	Start	31,514,410 bp
Band	20q11.21	End	31,577,923 bp

Gene location (Mouse)
Chr.	Chromosome 2 (mouse)
Band	2 H1|2 75.41 cM	Start	152,511,381 bp
Band	2 H1|2 75.41 cM	End	152,550,590 bp
RNA expression pattern
Bgee	Human / Mouse (ortholog); Top expressed in: body of pancreas; stromal cell of endometrium; bone marrow cell; anterior pituitary; islet of Langerhans; minor salivary glands; left adrenal gland; left adrenal cortex; canal of the cervix; right adrenal gland / Top expressed in: seminal vesicula; lacrimal gland; stroma of bone marrow; salivary gland; decidua; Rostral migratory stream; parotid gland; molar; submandibular gland; internal carotid artery; More reference expression data
BioGPS	n/a
Gene ontology
Molecular function	protein homodimerization activity; aspartic-type endopeptidase activity; aspartic endopeptidase activity, intramembrane cleaving; peptidase activity; protein binding; hydrolase activity; ubiquitin protein ligase binding
Cellular component	integral component of membrane; rough endoplasmic reticulum; endoplasmic reticulum membrane; membrane; integral component of cytoplasmic side of endoplasmic reticulum membrane; plasma membrane; Derlin-1 retrotranslocation complex; integral component of lumenal side of endoplasmic reticulum membrane; Golgi-associated vesicle membrane; lysosomal membrane; endoplasmic reticulum; cell surface
Biological process	membrane protein proteolysis; proteolysis; membrane protein proteolysis involved in retrograde protein transport, ER to cytosol; membrane protein intracellular domain proteolysis; membrane protein ectodomain proteolysis; protein homotetramerization; signal peptide processing
Sources:Amigo / QuickGO
Orthologs
Databases	NCBI: entry; OMA: entry
Species	Human	Mouse
Entrez	81502	14950
Ensembl	ENSG00000101294	ENSMUSG00000019188
UniProt	Q8TCT9	Q9D8V0
RefSeq (mRNA)	NM_030789; NM_178580; NM_178581; NM_178582	NM_001159551; NM_001159552; NM_001159553; NM_010376
RefSeq (protein)	NP_110416; NP_848695; NP_848696; NP_848697	NP_001153023; NP_001153024; NP_001153025; NP_034506
Location (UCSC)	Chr 20: 31.51 – 31.58 Mb	Chr 2: 152.51 – 152.55 Mb
PubMed search
- Wikidata
View/Edit Human	View/Edit Mouse

Minor histocompatibility antigen H13 is a protein that in humans is encoded by the HM13 gene.

== Function ==
The minor histocompatibility antigen 13 is a nonamer peptide that originates from a protein encoded by the H13 gene. The peptide is generated by the cytosol by the proteasome, enters the endoplasmic reticulum (ER) lumen by the transporter associated with antigen processing (TAP) and is presented on the cell surface on H2-D^{b} major histocompatibility antigen I (MHC I) molecules. The alloreactivity, which leads to transplant rejection in mice, is conferred by Val/Ile polymorphism in the ‘SSV(V/I)GVWYL’ peptide. The orthologue gene in humans is called HM13. If a related polymorphism exists, and if the HM13 serves as a Minor histocompatibility antigen, however, remains to be addressed.

The protein encoded by the M13/HM13 gene is the signal peptide peptidase (SPP), an ER-resident intramembrane protease. SPP localizes to the endoplasmic reticulum, catalyzes intramembrane proteolysis of some signal peptides after they have been cleaved from a preprotein. This activity is required to generate signal sequence-derived human lymphocyte antigen-E epitopes that are recognized by the immune system, and to process hepatitis C virus core protein. The encoded protein is an integral membrane protein with sequence motifs characteristic of the presenilin-type aspartic proteases. Multiple transcript variants encoding several different isoforms have been found for this gene.
