= Interleukin-12 subunit beta =

Protein-coding gene in the species Homo sapiens

IL12B
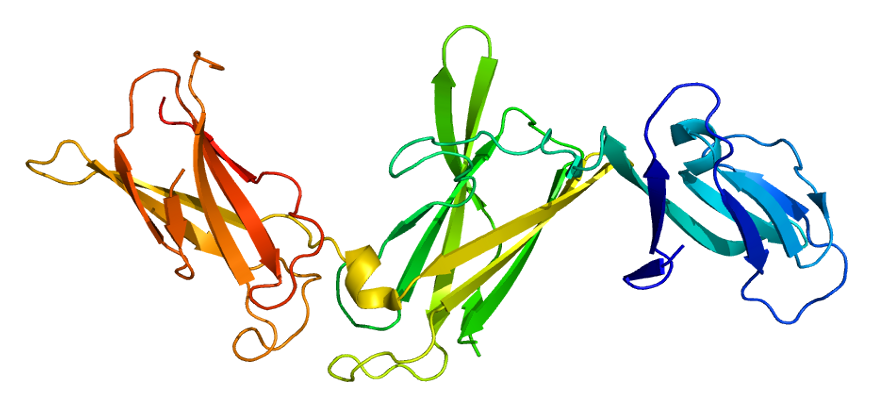

Identifiers
- Aliases: IL12B, CLMF, CLMF2, IL-12B, IMD28, NKSF, NKSF2, IMD29, Interleukin 12 subunit beta, interleukin 12B
- External IDs: OMIM: 161561; MGI: 96540; GeneCards: IL12B
Available structures
PDB	Ortholog search: PDBe RCSB
PDB	List of PDB id codes 1F42, 1F45, 3D85, 3D87, 3DUH, 3HMX, 3QWR, 4GRW, 4OE8, 4OG9

Gene location (Human)
Chr.	Chromosome 5 (human)
Band	5q33.3	Start	159,314,780 bp
Band	5q33.3	End	159,330,863 bp

Gene location (Mouse)
Chr.	Chromosome 11 (mouse)
Band	11 B1.1|11 25.94 cM	Start	44,290,890 bp
Band	11 B1.1|11 25.94 cM	End	44,304,860 bp
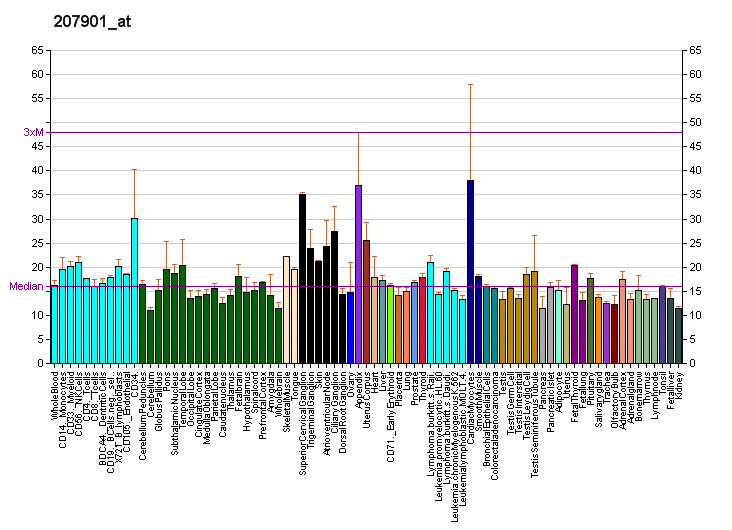
RNA expression pattern
Bgee	Human / Mouse (ortholog); Top expressed in: gonad; lymph node; pituitary gland; appendix; tibialis anterior muscle; anterior pituitary; rectum; gallbladder; human kidney; olfactory zone of nasal mucosa / Top expressed in: embryo; lumbar subsegment of spinal cord; thymus; tracheobronchial tree; tibiofemoral joint; spleen; trachea; right kidney; gastrula; carotid body; More reference expression data
BioGPS	More reference expression data
Gene ontology
Molecular function	cytokine activity; interleukin-23 receptor binding; protein homodimerization activity; interleukin-12 receptor binding; protein binding; identical protein binding; protein heterodimerization activity; interleukin-12 alpha subunit binding; cytokine receptor activity; growth factor activity; cytokine receptor binding; cytokine binding
Cellular component	cytoplasm; membrane; interleukin-12 complex; interleukin-23 complex; extracellular region; extracellular space; endoplasmic reticulum lumen; cytosol; late endosome lumen; cell surface; external side of plasma membrane; receptor complex
Biological process	positive regulation of cell adhesion; negative regulation of interleukin-10 production; negative regulation of smooth muscle cell proliferation; positive regulation of inflammatory response; sexual reproduction; positive regulation of interleukin-12 production; positive regulation of smooth muscle cell apoptotic process; defense response to Gram-negative bacterium; positive regulation of interleukin-10 production; positive regulation of T cell mediated cytotoxicity; natural killer cell activation; positive regulation of natural killer cell activation; positive regulation of interferon-gamma production; positive regulation of osteoclast differentiation; positive regulation of T-helper 17 cell lineage commitment; response to organic substance; positive regulation of NK T cell activation; positive regulation of natural killer cell proliferation; natural killer cell activation involved in immune response; cell surface receptor signaling pathway; positive regulation of NK T cell proliferation; positive regulation of T-helper 17 type immune response; negative regulation of inflammatory response to antigenic stimulus; defense response to virus; positive regulation of tissue remodeling; positive regulation of T-helper 1 type immune response; positive regulation of natural killer cell mediated cytotoxicity directed against tumor cell target; positive regulation of granulocyte macrophage colony-stimulating factor production; positive regulation of T cell proliferation; positive regulation of memory T cell differentiation; cellular response to interferon-gamma; positive regulation of tumor necrosis factor production; T-helper 1 type immune response; sensory perception of pain; response to UV-B; positive regulation of interleukin-17 production; cellular response to lipopolysaccharide; negative regulation of interleukin-17 production; T-helper cell differentiation; cell migration; positive regulation of lymphocyte proliferation; positive regulation of mononuclear cell proliferation; positive regulation of activated T cell proliferation; defense response to protozoan; positive regulation of defense response to virus by host; positive regulation of activation of Janus kinase activity; regulation of tyrosine phosphorylation of STAT protein; positive regulation of tyrosine phosphorylation of STAT protein; interleukin-12-mediated signaling pathway; cell population proliferation; regulation of signaling receptor activity; T-helper 1 cell cytokine production; cytokine-mediated signaling pathway; interleukin-23-mediated signaling pathway; positive regulation of NIK/NF-kappaB signaling
Sources:Amigo / QuickGO
Orthologs
Databases	NCBI: entry; OMA: entry
Species	Human	Mouse
Entrez	3593	16160
Ensembl	ENSG00000113302	ENSMUSG00000004296
UniProt	P29460	P43432
RefSeq (mRNA)	NM_002187	NM_008352; NM_001303244
RefSeq (protein)	NP_002178	NP_001290173
Location (UCSC)	Chr 5: 159.31 – 159.33 Mb	Chr 11: 44.29 – 44.3 Mb
PubMed search
- Wikidata
View/Edit Human	View/Edit Mouse

Subunit beta of interleukin 12 (also known as IL-12B, natural killer cell stimulatory factor 2, cytotoxic lymphocyte maturation factor p40, or interleukin-12 subunit p40) is a protein subunit that in humans is encoded by the IL12B gene. IL-12B is a common subunit of interleukin 12 and interleukin 23.

== Function ==
This gene encodes a subunit of interleukin 12, a cytokine that acts on T and natural killer cells, and has a broad array of biological activities. Interleukin 12 is a disulfide-linked heterodimer composed of the 40 kDa cytokine receptor like subunit encoded by this gene, and a 35 kDa subunit encoded by IL12A. This cytokine is expressed by activated macrophages that serve as an essential inducer of Th1 cells development. This cytokine has been found to be important for sustaining a sufficient number of memory/effector Th1 cells to mediate long-term protection to an intracellular pathogen. Overexpression of this gene was observed in the central nervous system of patients with multiple sclerosis (MS), suggesting a role of this cytokine in the pathogenesis of the disease. The promoter polymorphism of this gene has been reported to be associated with the severity of atopic and non-atopic asthma in children.

=== Role in receptor sharing with other interleukins ===
Interleukin-12 p40 also serves as a subunit of interleukin 23. Interleukin-12 p40 is characterized as binding to interleukin 12's beta 1 subunit, which is also a component of the interleukin 23 receptor, and binds to the beta 1 subunit while in complex with the interleukin 23 receptor as interleukin 23.
