= MCT-1 =

Protein-coding gene in humans

MCTS1
Available structures
PDB	Ortholog search: PDBe RCSB
PDB	List of PDB id codes 3R90

Identifiers
- Aliases: MCTS1, MCT-1, MCT1, malignant T-cell amplified sequence 1, re-initiation and release factor, MCTS1 re-initiation and release factor
- External IDs: OMIM: 300587; MGI: 1916245; HomoloGene: 5803; GeneCards: MCTS1; OMA:MCTS1 - orthologs

Gene location (Human)
Chr.	X chromosome (human)
Band	Xq24	Start	120,594,010 bp
Band	Xq24	End	120,621,159 bp

Gene location (Mouse)
Chr.	X chromosome (mouse)
Band	X|X A3.3	Start	37,689,455 bp
Band	X|X A3.3	End	37,702,303 bp
RNA expression pattern
Bgee	Human / Mouse (ortholog); Top expressed in: mucosa of transverse colon; islet of Langerhans; body of pancreas; prefrontal cortex; ganglionic eminence; stromal cell of endometrium; pituitary gland; anterior pituitary; tonsil; right adrenal gland / Top expressed in: facial motor nucleus; barrel cortex; superior cervical ganglion; anterior horn of spinal cord; medial ganglionic eminence; sternocleidomastoid muscle; soleus muscle; dermis; endothelial cell of lymphatic vessel; triceps brachii muscle; More reference expression data
BioGPS	n/a
Gene ontology
Molecular function	translation initiation factor activity; RNA binding; protein binding
Cellular component	plasma membrane; cytosolic small ribosomal subunit; cytoplasm; cytosol
Biological process	translational initiation; cell cycle; regulation of growth; regulation of transcription, DNA-templated; ribosome disassembly; protein biosynthesis; formation of translation preinitiation complex; transcription, DNA-templated; positive regulation of cell population proliferation; cellular response to DNA damage stimulus; translation reinitiation; IRES-dependent viral translational initiation
Sources:Amigo / QuickGO
Orthologs
Species	Human	Mouse
Entrez	28985	68995
Ensembl	ENSG00000232119; ENSG00000288295	ENSMUSG00000000355
UniProt	Q9ULC4	Q9DB27
RefSeq (mRNA)	NM_001137554; NM_014060	NM_026902; NM_001356359; NM_001356360; NM_001361381; NM_001361382
RefSeq (protein)	NP_001131026; NP_054779	NP_081178; NP_001343288; NP_001343289; NP_001348310; NP_001348311
Location (UCSC)	Chr X: 120.59 – 120.62 Mb	Chr X: 37.69 – 37.7 Mb
PubMed search
- Wikidata
View/Edit Human	View/Edit Mouse

MCTS1, re-initiation and release factor, otherwise known as MCT-1, is a protein that in humans is encoded by the MCTS1 gene.

== See also ==
- Eukaryotic translation
- Eukaryotic initiation factor
