= SPPL2A =

Protein-coding gene in the species Homo sapiens

Identifiers
- Aliases: SPPL2A, IMP3, PSL2, signal peptide peptidase like 2A, IMD86
- External IDs: OMIM: 608238; MGI: 1913802; GeneCards: SPPL2A

Gene location (Human)
Chr.	Chromosome 15 (human)
Band	15q21.2	Start	50,702,266 bp
Band	15q21.2	End	50,765,709 bp

Gene location (Mouse)
Chr.	Chromosome 2 (mouse)
Band	2|2 F1	Start	126,890,391 bp
Band	2|2 F1	End	126,933,235 bp
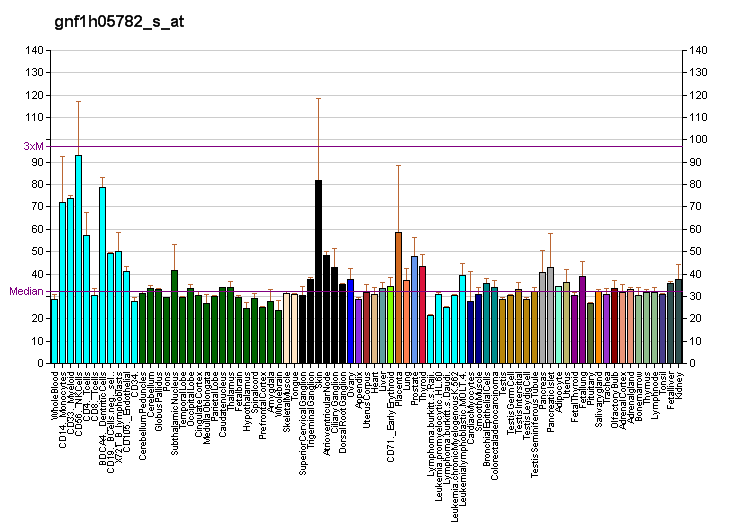

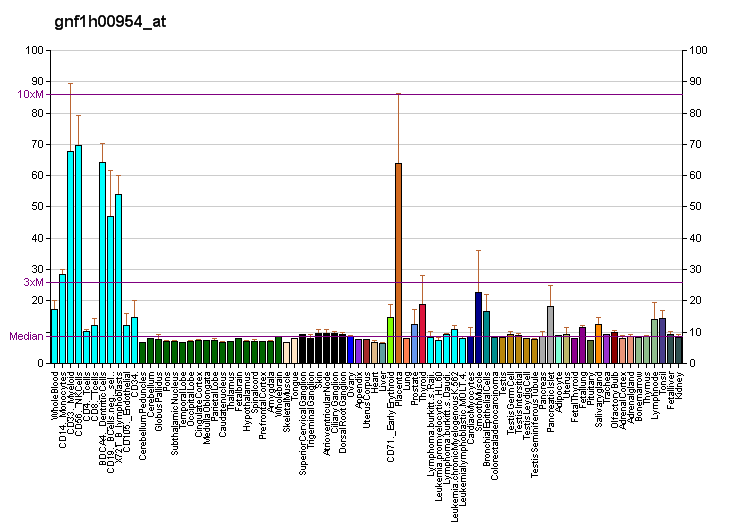
RNA expression pattern
Bgee	Human / Mouse (ortholog); Top expressed in: mucosa of ileum; secondary oocyte; tibialis anterior muscle; Skeletal muscle tissue of biceps brachii; vastus lateralis muscle; Skeletal muscle tissue of rectus abdominis; deltoid muscle; cartilage tissue; rectum; mucosa of colon / Top expressed in: body of femur; submandibular gland; ascending aorta; aortic valve; calvaria; stroma of bone marrow; left lobe of liver; knee joint; mesenteric lymph nodes; muscle of thigh; More reference expression data
BioGPS	More reference expression data
Gene ontology
Molecular function	protein homodimerization activity; aspartic-type endopeptidase activity; peptidase activity; protein binding; hydrolase activity; aspartic endopeptidase activity, intramembrane cleaving
Cellular component	integral component of membrane; endosome; late endosome; membrane; late endosome membrane; intracellular membrane-bounded organelle; integral component of cytoplasmic side of endoplasmic reticulum membrane; lysosomal membrane; Golgi-associated vesicle membrane; lysosome; integral component of lumenal side of endoplasmic reticulum membrane; extracellular exosome; plasma membrane
Biological process	membrane protein proteolysis; proteolysis; membrane protein ectodomain proteolysis; membrane protein intracellular domain proteolysis; regulation of immune response; regulation of tumor necrosis factor-mediated signaling pathway
Sources:Amigo / QuickGO
Orthologs
Databases	NCBI: entry; OMA: entry
Species	Human	Mouse
Entrez	84888	66552
Ensembl	ENSG00000138600	ENSMUSG00000027366
UniProt	Q8TCT8	Q9JJF9
RefSeq (mRNA)	NM_032802	NM_023220
RefSeq (protein)	NP_116191	NP_075709
Location (UCSC)	Chr 15: 50.7 – 50.77 Mb	Chr 2: 126.89 – 126.93 Mb
PubMed search
- Wikidata
View/Edit Human	View/Edit Mouse

Signal peptide peptidase-like 2A, also known as SPPL2A, is a human gene.

== Function ==
This gene is a member of the signal peptide peptidase-like protease (SPPL) family and encodes a lysosomal/late endosomal membrane protein with the conserved active site motifs 'YD' and 'GxGD' in adjacent transmembrane domains (TMDs). This protein plays a role in innate and adaptive immunity by cleaving TNFα in activated dendritic cells. A pseudogene of this gene also lies on chromosome 15.
