= Interleukin 12 receptor, beta 2 subunit =

Protein found in humans

IL12RB2

Identifiers
- Aliases: IL12RB2, Interleukin 12 receptor, beta 2 subunit, interleukin 12 receptor subunit beta 2
- External IDs: OMIM: 601642; MGI: 1270861; GeneCards: IL12RB2

Gene location (Human)
Chr.	Chromosome 1 (human)
Band	1p31.3	Start	67,307,364 bp
Band	1p31.3	End	67,398,724 bp

Gene location (Mouse)
Chr.	Chromosome 6 (mouse)
Band	6 C1|6 30.81 cM	Start	67,268,302 bp
Band	6 C1|6 30.81 cM	End	67,353,172 bp
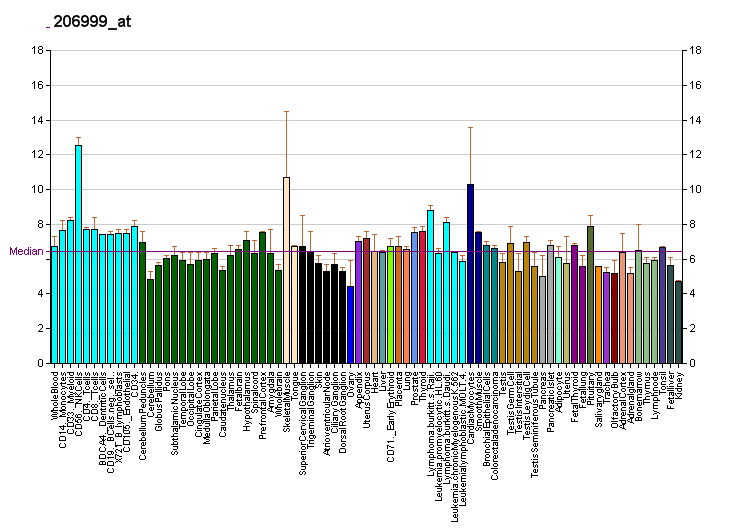
RNA expression pattern
Bgee	Human / Mouse (ortholog); Top expressed in: muscle of thigh; gastrocnemius muscle; testicle; body of pancreas; Achilles tendon; prefrontal cortex; gonad; granulocyte; lymph node; cingulate gyrus / Top expressed in: zygote; secondary oocyte; gray matter layer of cerebellum; morula; blastocyst; thymus; neural layer of retina; primary oocyte; muscle of thigh; striated muscle tissue; More reference expression data
BioGPS	More reference expression data
Gene ontology
Molecular function	cytokine receptor activity; protein kinase binding; cytokine binding
Cellular component	integral component of membrane; external side of plasma membrane; integral component of plasma membrane; plasma membrane; membrane; receptor complex
Biological process	response to lipopolysaccharide; cell surface receptor signaling pathway; positive regulation of cell population proliferation; positive regulation of interferon-gamma production; peptidyl-tyrosine phosphorylation; response to cytokine; interleukin-12-mediated signaling pathway; interleukin-35-mediated signaling pathway
Sources:Amigo / QuickGO
Orthologs
Databases	NCBI: entry; OMA: entry
Species	Human	Mouse
Entrez	3595	16162
Ensembl	ENSG00000081985	ENSMUSG00000018341
UniProt	Q99665	P97378
RefSeq (mRNA)	NM_001258214; NM_001258215; NM_001258216; NM_001559; NM_001319233 NM_001374259	NM_008354; NM_001311141
RefSeq (protein)	NP_001245143; NP_001245144; NP_001245145; NP_001306162; NP_001550 NP_001361188	NP_001298070; NP_032380
Location (UCSC)	Chr 1: 67.31 – 67.4 Mb	Chr 6: 67.27 – 67.35 Mb
PubMed search
- Wikidata
View/Edit Human	View/Edit Mouse

Interleukin 12 receptor, beta 2 subunit is a subunit of the interleukin 12 receptor. IL12RB2 is its human gene. IL12RB2 orthologs have been identified in all mammals for which complete genome data are available.

The protein encoded by this gene is a type I transmembrane protein identified as a subunit of the interleukin 12 receptor complex. The co-expression of this and IL12Rβ1 proteins was shown to lead to the formation of high-affinity IL12 binding sites and reconstitution of IL12 dependent signaling. While the IL12Rβ1 subunit is constitutively expressed, the expression of the IL12RB2 gene is up-regulated by interferon gamma. In Th1 cells, IL-12 signaling through the IL12 receptor leads to the phosphorylation of STAT4 and continued Th1 differentiation. The IL12Rβ2 subunit plays an important role in Th1 cell differentiation, since its absence leads to an abortive Th1 differentiation that has dysfunctional production of Th1 effector molecules. The up-regulation of this gene is found to be associated with a number of infectious diseases, such as Crohn's disease and leprosy, which is thought to contribute to the inflammatory response and host defense.

== Interactions ==
Interleukin 12 receptor, beta 2 subunit has been shown to interact with Janus kinase 2.

== RNA editing ==
The mRNA of this protein is subject to RNA editing.
