= STAT4 =

Protein-coding gene in the species Homo sapiens

Identifiers
- Aliases: STAT4, SLEB11, signal transducer and activator of transcription 4
- External IDs: OMIM: 600558; MGI: 103062; GeneCards: STAT4

Gene location (Human)
Chr.	Chromosome 2 (human)
Band	2q32.2-q32.3	Start	191,029,576 bp
Band	2q32.2-q32.3	End	191,151,596 bp

Gene location (Mouse)
Chr.	Chromosome 1 (mouse)
Band	1 C1.1|1 26.67 cM	Start	52,026,307 bp
Band	1 C1.1|1 26.67 cM	End	52,146,348 bp
RNA expression pattern
Bgee	Human / Mouse (ortholog); Top expressed in: granulocyte; sperm; middle temporal gyrus; blood; right auricle of heart; cardiac muscle tissue of right atrium; left testis; right testis; pituitary gland; right frontal lobe / Top expressed in: spermatid; seminiferous tubule; granulocyte; spermatocyte; mesenteric lymph nodes; blood; zygote; spleen; primary oocyte; secondary oocyte; More reference expression data
BioGPS	n/a
Gene ontology
Molecular function	protein binding; DNA-binding transcription factor activity; DNA binding; identical protein binding; DNA-binding transcription factor activity, RNA polymerase II-specific; RNA polymerase II cis-regulatory region sequence-specific DNA binding; DNA-binding transcription activator activity, RNA polymerase II-specific
Cellular component	cytoplasm; nucleus; nucleoplasm; cytosol
Biological process	transcription, DNA-templated; regulation of transcription, DNA-templated; receptor signaling pathway via JAK-STAT; signal transduction; positive regulation of transcription by RNA polymerase II; interleukin-12-mediated signaling pathway; cytokine-mediated signaling pathway; interleukin-21-mediated signaling pathway; interleukin-23-mediated signaling pathway; interleukin-35-mediated signaling pathway; defense response; regulation of cell population proliferation; response to peptide hormone
Sources:Amigo / QuickGO
Orthologs
Databases	NCBI: entry; OMA: entry
Species	Human	Mouse
Entrez	6775	20849
Ensembl	ENSG00000138378	ENSMUSG00000062939
UniProt	Q14765	P42228
RefSeq (mRNA)	NM_001243835; NM_003151	NM_011487; NM_001308266
RefSeq (protein)	NP_001230764; NP_003142	NP_001295195; NP_035617
Location (UCSC)	Chr 2: 191.03 – 191.15 Mb	Chr 1: 52.03 – 52.15 Mb
PubMed search
- Wikidata
View/Edit Human	View/Edit Mouse

Signal transducer and activator of transcription 4 (STAT4) is a transcription factor belonging to the STAT protein family, composed of STAT1, STAT2, STAT3, STAT4, STAT5A, STAT5B, STAT6. STAT proteins are key activators of gene transcription which bind to DNA in response to cytokine gradient. STAT proteins are a common part of Janus kinase (JAK)- signalling pathways, activated by cytokines.STAT4 is required for the development of Th1 cells from naive CD4+ T cells and IFN-γ production in response to IL-12. There are two known STAT4 transcripts, STAT4α and STAT4β, differing in the levels of interferon-gamma (IFN-γ )production downstream.

== Structure ==
Human as well murine STAT4 genes lie next to STAT1 gene locus suggesting that the genes arose by gene duplication. STAT proteins have six functional domains: 1. N-terminal interaction domain – crucial for dimerization of inactive STATs and nuclear translocation; 2.helical coiled coil domain – association with regulatory factors; 3. central DNA-binding domain – binding to the enhancer region of IFN-γ activated sequence (GAS) family genes; 4. linker domain – assisting during the DNA binding process; 5. Src homology 2 (SH2) domain – critical for specific binding to the cytokine receptor after tyrosine phosphorylation; 6. C-terminal transactivation domain – triggering the transcriptional process. The length of the protein is 748 amino acids, and the molecular weight is 85 941 Dalton.

== Expression ==
Distribution of STAT4 is restricted to myeloid cells, thymus and testis. In resting human T cells it is expressed at very low levels, but its production is amplified by PHA stimulation.

== Cytokines activating STAT4 ==
=== IL-12 ===
Pro-inflammatory cytokine IL-12 is produced in heterodimer form by B cells and antigen-presenting cells. Binding of IL-12 to IL-12R, which is composed of two different subunits (IL12Rβ1 and IL12Rβ2), leads to the interaction of IL12Rβ1 and IL12Rβ2 with JAK2 and TYK2, which is followed by phosphorylation of STAT4 tyrosine 693. The pathway then induces IFNγ production and Th1 differentiation. STAT4 is critical in promotion of antiviral response of natural killer (NK) cell by targeting of promotor regions of Runx1 and Runx3.

=== IFNα and IFNβ ===
Secreted by leukocytes, respectively fibroblasts, IFNα IFNβ together regulate antiviral immunity, cell proliferation and anti-tumor effects. In viral infection signalling pathway, either of IFNα or β binds to IFN receptor (IFNAR), composed of IFNAR1 and IFNAR2, immediately followed by the phosphorylation of STAT1, STAT4 and IFN target genes. During the initial phase of viral infection in NK cells, STAT1 activation is replaced by the activation of STAT4.

=== IL-23 ===
Monocytes, activated dendritic cells (DC) and macrophages stimulate the accumulation of IL-23 after exposure to molecules of Gram-positive/negative bacteria or viruses. Receptor for IL-23 contains IL12β_{1} and IL23R subunits, which upon binding of IL-23 promotes the phosphorylation STAT4. The presence of IL12β_{1} enables similar, although weaker downstream activity as compared to IL-12. During chronic inflammation, IL-23/STAT4 signalling pathway is involved in the induction of differentiation and expansion of Th17 pro-inflammatory T helper cells.

Additionally, other cytokines like IL2, IL 27, IL35, IL18 and IL21 are known to activate STAT4.

== Inhibitors of STAT4 signalling pathways ==
In cells with progressively increasing expression of IL12 and IL6, SOCSs production and activity suppress cytokine signalling and phosphorylation of JAK-STAT pathways in a negative feedback loop.

Other suppressors of the pathways are: protein inhibitor of activated STAT (PAIS) (regulation of transcriptional activity in the nucleus, observed in STAT4-DNA binding complex), protein tyrosine phosphatase (PTP) (removal of phosphate groups from phosphorylated tyrosine in JAK/STAT pathway proteins), STAT-interacting LIM protein (SLIM) (STAT ubiquitin E3 ligase blocking the phosphorylation of STAT4) or microRNA (miRNA) (degradation of STAT4 mRNA and its post-transcriptional regulation).

== Target genes ==
STAT4 binds to hundreds of sites in the genome, among others to the promoters of genes for cytokines (IFN-γ, TNF), receptors (IL18R1, IL12rβ2, IL18RAP), and signaling factors (MYD88).

== Disease ==
STAT4 is involved in several autoimmune and cancer diseases in animal models humans, significantly in the disease progression and pathology. STAT4 were significantly increased in patients with Ulcerative colitis and skin T cells of psoriatic patients. Moreover, STAT4 -/- mice developed less severe experimental autoimmune encephalo-myelitis (EAE) than the wild type mice.

Intronic single nucleotide polymorphism (SNP) mostly in third intron of the STAT4 has shown to be associated with immune dysregulation and autoimmunity including systemic lupus erythematosus (SLE) and rheumatoid arthritis as well as Sjögren's disease (SD), systemic sclerosis, psoriasis and also type-1 diabetes. High incident of STAT4 genetic polymorphisms and susceptibility to autoimmune diseases is a reason to consider the STAT4 as general autoimmune disease susceptibility locus.
