= Interleukin 12 =

Interleukin

Human Interleukin 12
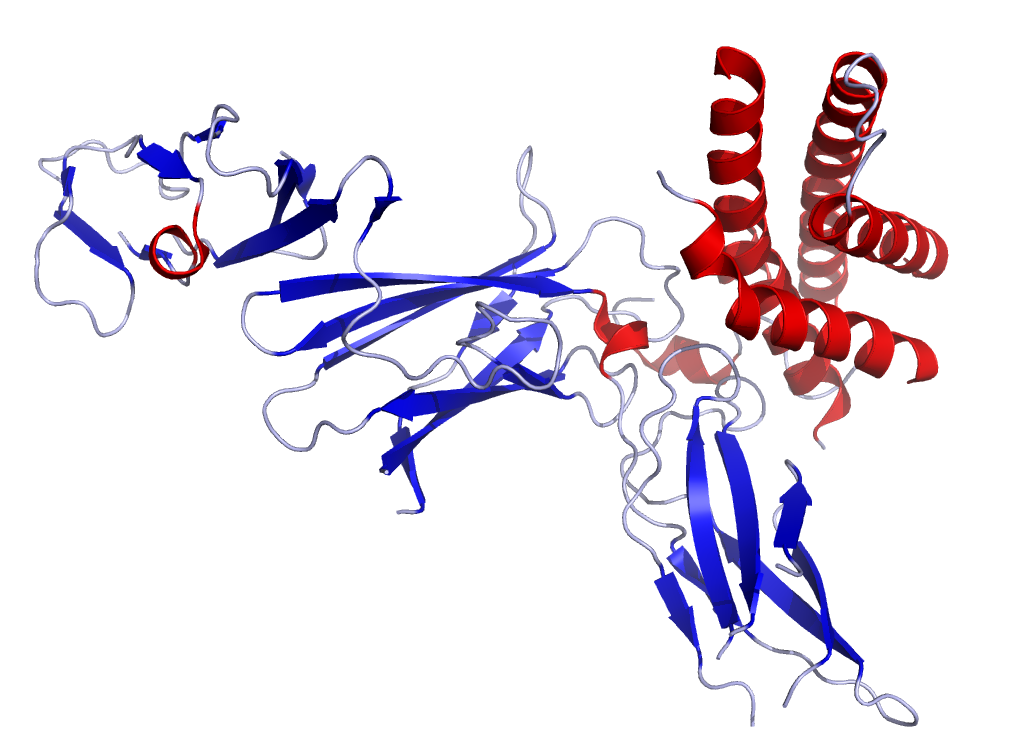
- Crystal structure of human IL-12

Identifiers
- Symbol: IL12, p70
- PDB: 1F45

IL12A

Identifiers
- Symbol: IL12A
- Alt. symbols: CLMF1, NKSF1, p35
- NCBI gene: 3592
- HGNC: 5969
- OMIM: 161560
- RefSeq: NM_000882
- UniProt: P29459

Other data
- Locus: Chr. 3 p12-q13.2
Search for
- Structures: Swiss-model
- Domains: InterPro

interleukin 12B
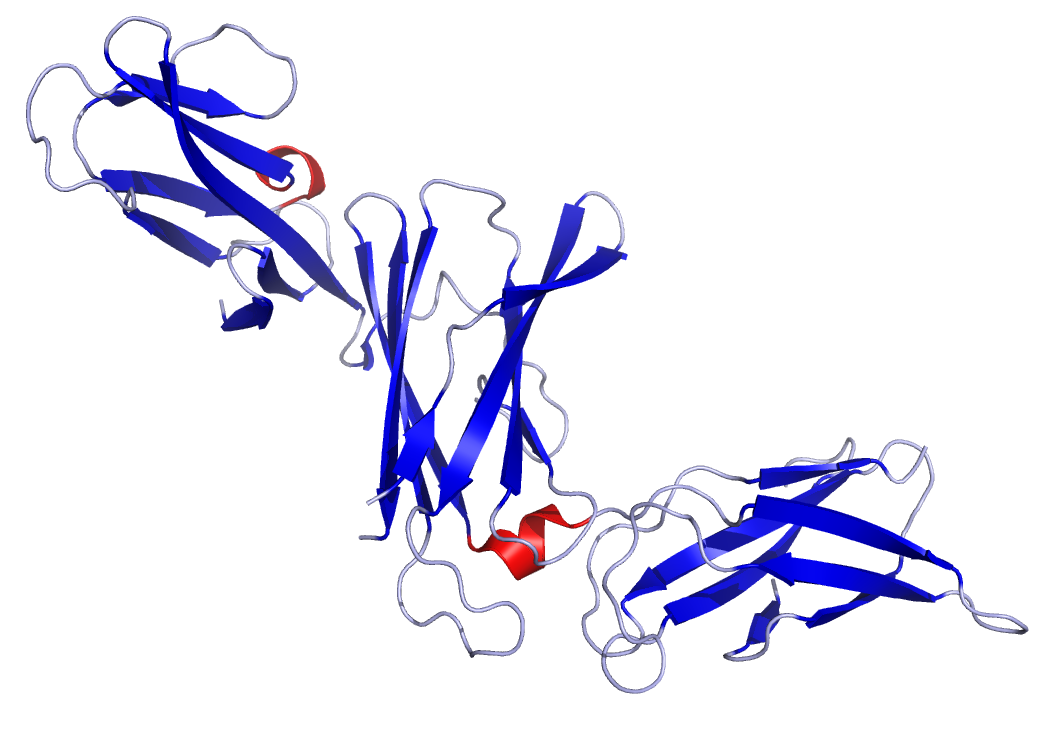
- Crystal structure of IL-12B

Identifiers
- Symbol: IL12B
- Alt. symbols: CLMF2, NKSF2, p40
- NCBI gene: 3593
- HGNC: 5970
- OMIM: 161561
- PDB: 1F42
- RefSeq: NM_002187
- UniProt: P29460

Other data
- Locus: Chr. 5 q31.1-33.1
Search for
- Structures: Swiss-model
- Domains: InterPro

Interleukin 12 (IL-12) is an interleukin that is naturally produced by dendritic cells, macrophages, neutrophils, helper T cells and human B-lymphoblastoid cells (NC-37) in response to antigenic stimulation. IL-12 belongs to the family of interleukin-12. IL-12 family is unique in comprising the only heterodimeric cytokines, which includes IL-12, IL-23, IL-27 and IL-35. Despite sharing many structural features and molecular partners, they mediate surprisingly diverse functional effects.

== Gene and structure ==
IL12 is a heterodimeric cytokine encoded by two separate genes, IL-12A (p35) and IL-12B (p40). The active heterodimer (referred to as 'p70'), and a homodimer of p40 are formed following protein synthesis. IL12A is composed of a bundle of four alpha helices. IL12B has three beta sheet domains.

== Functions ==
IL-12 is involved in the differentiation of naive T cells into Th1 cells. It is known as a T cell-stimulating factor, which can stimulate the growth and function of T cells. It stimulates the production of interferon-gamma (IFN-γ) and tumor necrosis factor-alpha (TNF-α) from T cells and natural killer (NK) cells, and reduces IL-4 mediated suppression of IFN-γ. T cells that produce IL-12 have a coreceptor, CD30, which is associated with IL-12 activity.

IL-12 plays an important role in the activities of natural killer cells and T lymphocytes. IL-12 mediates enhancement of the cytotoxic activity of NK cells and CD8+ cytotoxic T lymphocytes. There also seems to be a link between IL-2 and the signal transduction of IL-12 in NK cells. IL-2 stimulates the expression of two IL-12 receptors, IL-12R-β1 and IL-12R-β2, maintaining the expression of a critical protein involved in IL-12 signaling in NK cells. Enhanced functional response is demonstrated by IFN-γ production and killing of target cells.

IL-12 also has anti-angiogenic activity, which means it can block the formation of new blood vessels. It does this by increasing production of interferon gamma, which in turn increases the production of a chemokine called inducible protein-10 (IP-10 or CXCL10). IP-10 then mediates this anti-angiogenic effect. Because of its ability to induce immune responses and its anti-angiogenic activity, there has been an interest in testing IL-12 as a possible anti-cancer drug. However, it has not been shown to have substantial activity in the tumors tested to this date. Recent preclinical studies have shown that targeted delivery of IL-12 via nanoparticles can enhance IL-12’s antitumor activity in metastatic ovarian cancer. In mouse models, liposomal nanoparticles coated with poly-L-arginine and poly-L-glutamate were engineered to slowly release IL-12 directly into tumor sites, resulting in strong T-cell infiltration, allowing cytotoxic T cells to recognize and attack tumor cells and thereby significantly extending survival. There is a link that may be useful in treatment between IL-12 and the diseases psoriasis & inflammatory bowel disease. There has also been research indicating that interleukin 12 is linked with interleukin 23 and antibodies against these factors have a possible role in creating an anti-inflammatory effect in inflammatory bowel disease.

== Signal transduction ==
IL-12 binds to the IL-12 receptor, which is a heterodimeric receptor formed by IL-12Rβ1 and IL-12Rβ2. IL-12Rβ2 is considered to play a key role in IL-12 function, since it is found on activated T cells and is stimulated by cytokines that promote Th1 cells development and inhibited by those that promote Th2 cells development. Upon binding, IL-12R-β2 becomes tyrosine phosphorylated and provides binding sites for kinases, Tyk2 and Jak2. These are important in activating critical transcription factor proteins such as STAT4 that are implicated in IL-12 signaling in T cells and NK cells. This pathway is known as the JAK-STAT pathway.

An extensive review and visualization of IL-12 signaling can be found at the peer-reviewed pathway database Reactome: Interleukin-12 family

== Autoimmunity ==
IL-12 is linked with autoimmunity. Administration of IL-12 to people suffering from autoimmune diseases was shown to worsen the autoimmune phenomena. This is believed to be due to its key role in induction of Th1 immune responses. In contrast, IL-12 gene knock-out in mice or a treatment of mice with IL-12 specific antibodies ameliorated the disease.

Results published in the Journal of Allergy and Clinical Immunology from a study where mice that were bred to be allergic to peanuts, interleukin-12 has been shown to not be present, suggesting that the molecule normally stops allergies to food from developing. Further investigation is underway, to determine whether the results found in mice are as profound in humans.

== IL-12 and IL-12 receptor β1 mutations ==
Interleukin 12 (IL-12) is produced by activated antigen-presenting cells (dendritic cells, macrophages). It promotes the development of Th1 responses and is a powerful inducer of IFNγ production by T and NK cells.

A child with Bacillus Calmette–Guérin and Salmonella enteritidis infection was found to have a large homozygous deletion within the IL-12 p40 subunit gene, precluding expression of functional IL-12 p70 cytokine by activated dendritic cells and phagocytes. As a result, IFNγ production by the child's lymphocytes was markedly impaired. This suggested that IL-12 is essential for protective immunity to intracellular bacteria such as mycobacteria and Salmonella.

Support is lent to this idea by the observation that a receptor for IL-12 is important for IFNγ production by lymphocytes. T and NK cells from seven unrelated patients who had severe idiopathic mycobacterial and Salmonella infections failed to produce IFNγ when stimulated with IL-12. The patients were otherwise healthy. They were found to have mutations in the IL-12 receptor β1 chain, resulting in premature stop codons in the extracellular domain, resulting in unresponsiveness to this cytokine, again demonstrating IL-12's crucial role in host defense.

Defective Th1 and Th17 immune responses leading to chronic mucocutaneous candidiasis result from a mutation further downstream in the IL-12 signalling pathway. The trait was mapped to mutations in the STAT1 gene, which were associated with lower production of interferon-γ, IL-17, and IL-22 in response to IL-12 or IL-23 receptor associated Jak2 and Tyk2 activity.

== See also ==
- CNTO 1275
