= Interleukin-23 receptor =

Protein found in humans

IL23R

Identifiers
- Aliases: IL23R, interleukin 23 receptor
- External IDs: OMIM: 607562; MGI: 2181693; GeneCards: IL23R

Gene location (Human)
Chr.	Chromosome 1 (human)
Band	1p31.3	Start	67,138,907 bp
Band	1p31.3	End	67,259,979 bp

Gene location (Mouse)
Chr.	Chromosome 6 (mouse)
Band	6|6 C1	Start	67,399,916 bp
Band	6|6 C1	End	67,468,839 bp
RNA expression pattern
Bgee	Human / Mouse (ortholog); Top expressed in: secondary oocyte; amniotic fluid; rectum; islet of Langerhans; appendix; epithelium of colon; gallbladder; right adrenal gland; right adrenal cortex; left adrenal gland / Top expressed in: zygote; secondary oocyte; primary oocyte; embryo; embryo; adrenal gland; thymus; ileum; jejunum; esophagus; More reference expression data
BioGPS	n/a
Gene ontology
Molecular function	interleukin-23 receptor activity; interleukin-12 receptor binding; protein binding; interleukin-23 binding; cytokine receptor activity; cytokine binding
Cellular component	integral component of membrane; interleukin-23 receptor complex; membrane; receptor complex; plasma membrane; external side of plasma membrane
Biological process	negative regulation of interleukin-10 production; response to interferon-gamma; positive regulation of interleukin-12 production; immune system process; positive regulation of T cell mediated cytotoxicity; positive regulation of interferon-gamma production; positive regulation of osteoclast differentiation; positive regulation of T-helper 17 cell lineage commitment; positive regulation of NK T cell activation; positive regulation of natural killer cell proliferation; response to lipopolysaccharide; positive regulation of T-helper 17 type immune response; positive regulation of T-helper 1 type immune response; positive regulation of granulocyte macrophage colony-stimulating factor production; defense response to Gram-negative bacterium; positive regulation of T cell proliferation; positive regulation of memory T cell differentiation; positive regulation of interleukin-17 production; innate immune response; inflammatory response; positive regulation of activated T cell proliferation; positive regulation of defense response to virus by host; positive regulation of activation of Janus kinase activity; regulation of tyrosine phosphorylation of STAT protein; positive regulation of tyrosine phosphorylation of STAT protein; cytokine-mediated signaling pathway; interleukin-23-mediated signaling pathway
Sources:Amigo / QuickGO
Orthologs
Databases	NCBI: entry; OMA: entry
Species	Human	Mouse
Entrez	149233	209590
Ensembl	ENSG00000162594	ENSMUSG00000049093
UniProt	Q5VWK5	Q8K4B4
RefSeq (mRNA)	NM_144701	NM_144548
RefSeq (protein)	NP_653302	NP_653131
Location (UCSC)	Chr 1: 67.14 – 67.26 Mb	Chr 6: 67.4 – 67.47 Mb
PubMed search
- Wikidata
View/Edit Human	View/Edit Mouse

The interleukin-23 receptor is a type I cytokine receptor. It is encoded in human by the IL23R gene. In complex with the interleukin-12 receptor β1 subunit (IL-12Rβ1), it is activated by the cytokine interleukin 23 (IL-23). The IL23R mRNA is 2.8 kilobases in length and includes 12 exons. The translated protein contains 629 amino acids; it is a type I penetrating protein and includes a signal peptide, an N-terminal fibronectin III-like domain and an intracellular part that contains three potential tyrosine phosphorylation domains. There are 24 IL23R splice variants in mitogen-activated lymphocytes. IL23R includes some single-nucleotide polymorphisms in the region encoding the domain that binds IL-23, which may lead to differences between people in Th17 activation. There is also a variant of IL-23R that consists of just the extracellular part and is known as soluble IL-23R. This form can compete with the membrane-bound form to bind IL-23, modulating the Th17 immune response and regulation of inflammation and immune function.

== Function ==
The protein encoded by this gene is a subunit of the receptor for IL-23. This protein pairs with the receptor molecule IL-12Rβ1 (IL12RB1), together forming the IL-23 receptor complex, and both are required for IL-23 signaling. This protein associates constitutively with Janus kinase 2 (JAK2) and also binds to transcription activator STAT3 in a ligand-dependent manner.

== Clinical significance ==
Three variants in the IL23R gene have been shown to protect against Crohn's disease and ulcerative colitis. The effect of IL-23R variations present in the population have been studied with an in vitro expression model system.
