= IL12A =

Protein-coding gene in the species Homo sapiens

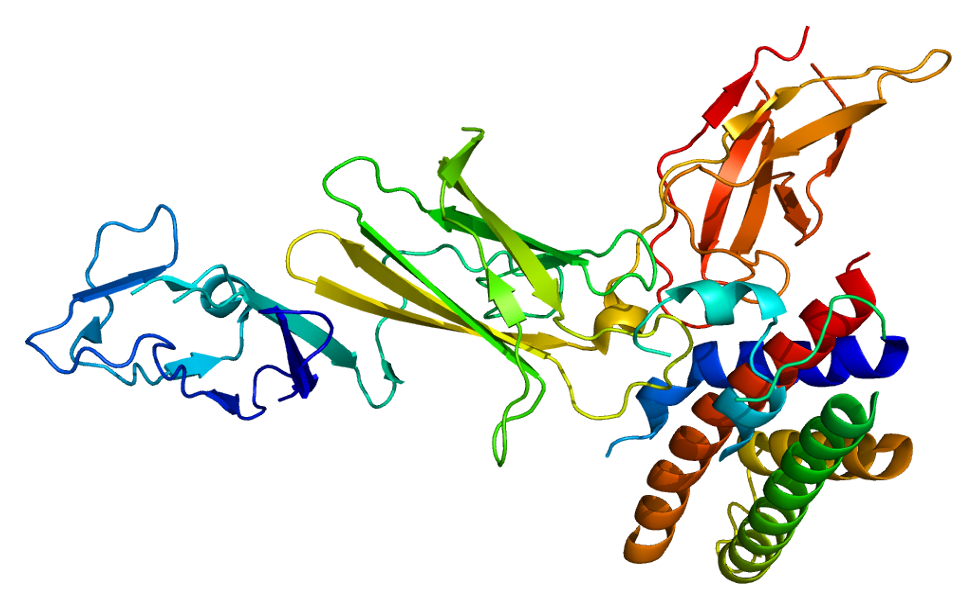
Available structures
PDB	Ortholog search: PDBe RCSB
PDB	List of PDB id codes 1F45, 3HMX

Identifiers
- Aliases: IL12A, CLMF, IL-12A, NFSK, NKSF1, P35, interleukin 12A
- External IDs: OMIM: 161560; MGI: 96539; HomoloGene: 681; GeneCards: IL12A; OMA:IL12A - orthologs

Gene location (Human)
Chr.	Chromosome 3 (human)
Band	3q25.33	Start	159,988,835 bp
Band	3q25.33	End	159,996,019 bp

Gene location (Mouse)
Chr.	Chromosome 3 (mouse)
Band	3 E1|3 31.92 cM	Start	68,597,977 bp
Band	3 E1|3 31.92 cM	End	68,605,880 bp
RNA expression pattern
Bgee	Human / Mouse (ortholog); Top expressed in: gonad; testicle; right uterine tube; ventricular zone; olfactory zone of nasal mucosa; upper lobe of left lung; spleen; granulocyte; stromal cell of endometrium; amygdala / Top expressed in: muscle of thigh; embryo; knee joint; triceps brachii muscle; quadriceps femoris muscle; skeletal muscle tissue; granulocyte; tibiofemoral joint; gastrocnemius muscle; spleen; More reference expression data
BioGPS	n/a
Gene ontology
Molecular function	cytokine activity; interleukin-27 binding; interleukin-12 beta subunit binding; protein binding; protein heterodimerization activity; growth factor activity; interleukin-12 receptor binding
Cellular component	cytoplasm; interleukin-12 complex; extracellular region; extracellular space; endoplasmic reticulum lumen; late endosome lumen; cell surface
Biological process	positive regulation of T cell differentiation; negative regulation of smooth muscle cell proliferation; extrinsic apoptotic signaling pathway; positive regulation of smooth muscle cell apoptotic process; response to virus; positive regulation of T cell mediated cytotoxicity; positive regulation of interferon-gamma production; positive regulation of natural killer cell activation; positive regulation of NK T cell activation; response to lipopolysaccharide; positive regulation of natural killer cell mediated cytotoxicity directed against tumor cell target; immune response; response to UV-B; cellular response to lipopolysaccharide; negative regulation of interleukin-17 production; cell migration; positive regulation of natural killer cell mediated cytotoxicity; positive regulation of lymphocyte proliferation; positive regulation of dendritic cell chemotaxis; positive regulation of mononuclear cell proliferation; positive regulation of cell adhesion; defense response to protozoan; defense response to Gram-positive bacterium; positive regulation of T cell proliferation; positive regulation of tyrosine phosphorylation of STAT protein; interleukin-12-mediated signaling pathway; cell population proliferation; regulation of signaling receptor activity; T-helper 1 cell cytokine production; cytokine-mediated signaling pathway; interleukin-35-mediated signaling pathway; T-helper 1 cell activation
Sources:Amigo / QuickGO
Orthologs
Species	Human	Mouse
Entrez	3592	16159
Ensembl	ENSG00000168811	ENSMUSG00000027776
UniProt	P29459	P43431
RefSeq (mRNA)	NM_000882; NM_001354582; NM_001354583; NM_001397992	NM_001159424; NM_008351
RefSeq (protein)	NP_000873; NP_001341511; NP_001341512	NP_001152896; NP_032377
Location (UCSC)	Chr 3: 159.99 – 160 Mb	Chr 3: 68.6 – 68.61 Mb
PubMed search
- Wikidata
View/Edit Human	View/Edit Mouse

Interleukin-12 subunit alpha (IL-12 p35) is a protein that in humans is encoded by the IL12A gene.

== Function ==
This gene encodes a subunit of the cytokine Interleukin 12 (IL-12) that acts on T and natural killer cells, and has a broad array of biological activities. The cytokine is a disulfide-linked heterodimer composed of the 35-kD subunit encoded by this gene, and a 40-kD subunit that is a member of the cytokine receptor family. This cytokine is required for the T-cell-dependent induction of interferon gamma (IFN-γ), and is important for the differentiation of both Th1 and Th2 cells. The responses of lymphocytes to this cytokine are mediated by the activator of transcription protein STAT4. Nitric oxide synthase 2A (NOS2A/NOS2) is found to be required for the signaling process of this cytokine in innate immunity.
