= Janus kinase 2 =

Non-receptor tyrosine kinase and coding gene in humans

JAK2
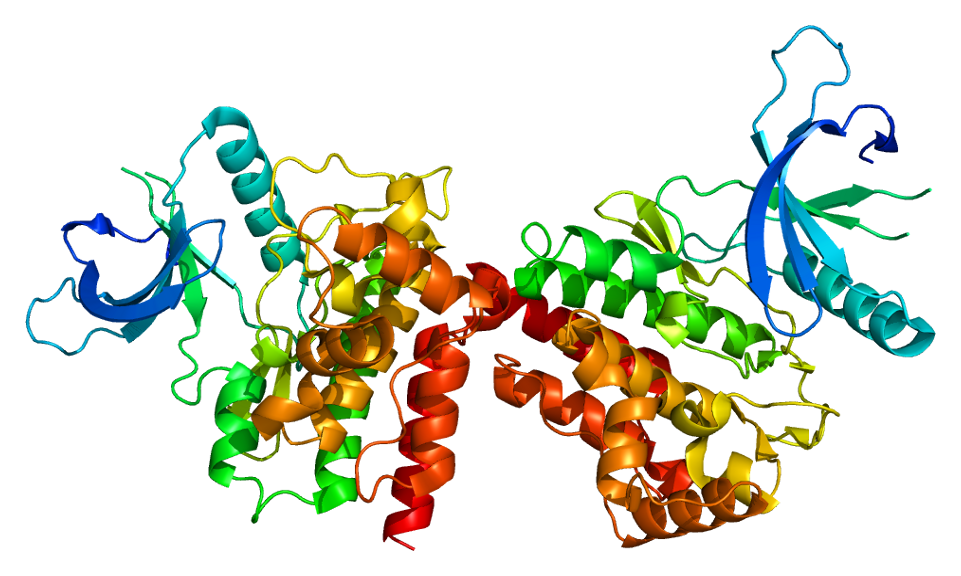

Identifiers
- Aliases: JAK2, JTK10, THCYT3, Janus kinase 2, MAX2
- External IDs: OMIM: 147796; MGI: 96629; GeneCards: JAK2
Available structures
PDB	Ortholog search: PDBe RCSB
PDB	List of PDB id codes 5AEP, 2B7A, 2W1I, 2XA4, 3E62, 3E63, 3E64, 3FUP, 3IO7, 3IOK, 3JY9, 3KCK, 3KRR, 3LPB, 3Q32, 3RVG, 3TJC, 3TJD, 3UGC, 3ZMM, 4AQC, 4BBE, 4BBF, 4C61, 4C62, 4D0W, 4D0X, 4D1S, 4E4M, 4E6D, 4E6Q, 4F08, 4F09, 4FVP, 4FVQ, 4FVR, 4GFM, 4GMY, 4HGE, 4IVA, 4JI9, 4JIA, 4P7E, 4ZIM, 4YTC, 4YTF, 4YTH, 4YTI, 5CF4, 5CF5, 5CF6, 5CF8, 5I4N, 4Z32, 5L3A
Enzyme activity
EC #	BRENDA	ExPASy	KEGG	MetaCyc
2.7.10.2	↗	↗	↗	↗

Gene location (Human)
Chr.	Chromosome 9 (human)
Band	9p24.1	Start	4,984,390 bp
Band	9p24.1	End	5,129,948 bp

Gene location (Mouse)
Chr.	Chromosome 19 (mouse)
Band	19 C1|19 23.73 cM	Start	29,229,228 bp
Band	19 C1|19 23.73 cM	End	29,290,480 bp
RNA expression pattern
Bgee	Human / Mouse (ortholog); Top expressed in: Achilles tendon; monocyte; popliteal artery; tibial arteries; glutes; Descending thoracic aorta; ascending aorta; sural nerve; tibia; left coronary artery / Top expressed in: zygote; secondary oocyte; primary oocyte; blood; Paneth cell; jejunum; uterus; Rostral migratory stream; fossa; mesenteric lymph nodes; More reference expression data
BioGPS	n/a
Gene ontology
Molecular function	SH2 domain binding; kinase activity; signaling receptor binding; ATP binding; growth hormone receptor binding; interleukin-12 receptor binding; metal ion binding; heme binding; histone kinase activity (H3-Y41 specific); transferase activity; histone binding; protein binding; protein tyrosine kinase activity; protein kinase binding; nucleotide binding; non-membrane spanning protein tyrosine kinase activity; identical protein binding; protein kinase activity; protein C-terminus binding; type 1 angiotensin receptor binding; acetylcholine receptor binding; phosphatidylinositol 3-kinase binding; insulin receptor substrate binding; peptide hormone receptor binding
Cellular component	cytoplasm; cytosol; membrane; extrinsic component of cytoplasmic side of plasma membrane; caveola; cytoskeleton; nucleus; nuclear matrix; endosome lumen; membrane raft; endomembrane system; nucleoplasm; plasma membrane; focal adhesion; postsynapse; glutamatergic synapse
Biological process	negative regulation of neuron apoptotic process; intrinsic apoptotic signaling pathway in response to oxidative stress; adaptive immune response; interferon-gamma-mediated signaling pathway; negative regulation of DNA binding; tumor necrosis factor-mediated signaling pathway; protein phosphorylation; positive regulation of phosphoprotein phosphatase activity; growth hormone receptor signaling pathway; positive regulation of interleukin-1 beta production; positive regulation of DNA binding; mesoderm development; activation of cysteine-type endopeptidase activity involved in apoptotic process; negative regulation of cell population proliferation; apoptotic process; regulation of apoptotic process; positive regulation of cell activation; mammary gland epithelium development; extrinsic apoptotic signaling pathway; axon regeneration; activation of cysteine-type endopeptidase activity involved in apoptotic signaling pathway; response to antibiotic; positive regulation of nitric-oxide synthase biosynthetic process; response to oxidative stress; response to tumor necrosis factor; response to interleukin-12; positive regulation of cell differentiation; positive regulation of tumor necrosis factor production; positive regulation of peptidyl-tyrosine phosphorylation; erythrocyte differentiation; protein autophosphorylation; platelet-derived growth factor receptor signaling pathway; positive regulation of cell-substrate adhesion; positive regulation of growth hormone receptor signaling pathway; G protein-coupled receptor signaling pathway; cell differentiation; growth hormone receptor signaling pathway via JAK-STAT; positive regulation of inflammatory response; phosphorylation; immune system process; positive regulation of DNA-binding transcription factor activity; negative regulation of cardiac muscle cell apoptotic process; actin filament polymerization; response to lipopolysaccharide; regulation of inflammatory response; peptidyl-tyrosine autophosphorylation; enzyme linked receptor protein signaling pathway; positive regulation of insulin secretion; receptor signaling pathway via JAK-STAT; intracellular signal transduction; negative regulation of cell-cell adhesion; mineralocorticoid receptor signaling pathway; negative regulation of heart contraction; positive regulation of cell migration; positive regulation of cytosolic calcium ion concentration; positive regulation of nitric oxide biosynthetic process; blood coagulation; response to hydroperoxide; MAPK cascade; regulation of interferon-gamma-mediated signaling pathway; regulation of cell population proliferation; positive regulation of cell population proliferation; hormone-mediated signaling pathway; positive regulation of apoptotic process; positive regulation of phosphatidylinositol 3-kinase signaling; peptidyl-tyrosine phosphorylation; cell migration; signal transduction; positive regulation of epithelial cell apoptotic process; positive regulation of growth factor dependent skeletal muscle satellite cell proliferation; innate immune response; negative regulation of cell death; positive regulation of vascular associated smooth muscle cell proliferation; positive regulation of tyrosine phosphorylation of STAT protein; activation of Janus kinase activity; tyrosine phosphorylation of STAT protein; interleukin-12-mediated signaling pathway; cytokine-mediated signaling pathway; interleukin-23-mediated signaling pathway; interleukin-6-mediated signaling pathway; interleukin-27-mediated signaling pathway; interleukin-35-mediated signaling pathway; chromatin organization; regulation of receptor signaling pathway via JAK-STAT; regulation of nitric oxide biosynthetic process; positive regulation of Ras protein signal transduction; modulation of chemical synaptic transmission; postsynapse to nucleus signaling pathway; positive regulation of cold-induced thermogenesis; microglial cell activation; positive regulation of MHC class II biosynthetic process
Sources:Amigo / QuickGO
Orthologs
Databases	NCBI: entry; OMA: entry
Species	Human	Mouse
Entrez	3717	16452
Ensembl	ENSG00000096968	ENSMUSG00000024789
UniProt	O60674	Q62120
RefSeq (mRNA)	NM_004972; NM_001322194; NM_001322195; NM_001322196; NM_001322198 NM_001322199; NM_001322204	NM_001048177; NM_008413
RefSeq (protein)	NP_001309123; NP_001309124; NP_001309125; NP_001309127; NP_001309128 NP_001309133; NP_004963	NP_001041642; NP_032439
Location (UCSC)	Chr 9: 4.98 – 5.13 Mb	Chr 19: 29.23 – 29.29 Mb
PubMed search
- Wikidata
View/Edit Human	View/Edit Mouse

Janus kinase 2 (commonly called JAK2) is a non-receptor tyrosine kinase. It is a member of the Janus kinase family and has been implicated in signaling by members of the type II cytokine receptor family (e.g. interferon receptors), the GM-CSF receptor family (IL-3R, IL-5R and GM-CSF-R), the gp130 receptor family (e.g., IL-6R), and the single chain receptors (e.g. Epo-R, Tpo-R, GH-R, PRL-R).

The distinguishing feature between janus kinase 2 and other JAK kinases is the lack of Src homology binding domains (SH2/SH3) and the presence of up to seven JAK homology domains (JH1-JH7). Nonetheless the terminal JH domains retain a high level of homology to tyrosine kinase domains. An interesting note is that only one of these carboxy-terminal JH domains retains full kinase function (JH1) while the other (JH2), previously thought to have no kinase functionality and accordingly termed a pseudokinase domain, has since been found to be catalytically active, albeit at only 10% that of the JH1 domain.

Loss of JAK2 is lethal by embryonic day 12 in mice.

JAK2 orthologs have been identified in all mammals for which complete genome data are available.

== Clinical significance ==
JAK2 gene fusions with the TEL(ETV6) (TEL-JAK2) and PCM1 genes have been found in patients suffering leukemia, particularly clonal eosinophilia forms of the disease.

Mutations in JAK2 have been implicated in polycythemia vera, essential thrombocythemia, and myelofibrosis as well as other myeloproliferative disorders. This mutation (V617F), a change of valine to phenylalanine at the 617 position, appears to render hematopoietic cells more sensitive to growth factors such as erythropoietin and thrombopoietin, because the receptors for these growth factors require JAK2 for signal transduction. JAK2 mutation, when demonstrable, is one of the methods of diagnosing polycythemia vera.

== Interactions ==
Janus kinase 2 has been shown to interact with:

- DNAJA3
- EGFR
- EPOR
- FYN
- Grb2
- GHR
- IRS1
- IL12RB2
- IL5RA
- PIK3R1
- PPP2R4
- PTK2
- PTPN11
- PTPN6
- PRMT5
- SH2B1
- SHC1
- SOCS3
- STAT5A
- STAT5B
- STAM
- SOCS1
- TEC
- TNFRSF1A
- VAV1
- YES1

Prolactin signals through JAK2 are dependent on STAT5, and on the RUSH transcription factors.

== See also ==
- Janus kinase inhibitor, medical drugs under development
- Ruxolitinib
