= Interleukin 12 receptor, beta 1 subunit =

Protein and coding gene in humans

IL12RB1

Identifiers
- Aliases: IL12RB1, CD212, IL-12R-BETA1, IL12RB, IMD30, Interleukin 12 receptor beta 1 subunit, IL12 receptor beta 1 subunit, interleukin 12 receptor subunit beta 1
- External IDs: OMIM: 601604; MGI: 104579; GeneCards: IL12RB1

Gene location (Human)
Chr.	Chromosome 19 (human)
Band	19p13.11	Start	18,058,995 bp
Band	19p13.11	End	18,098,944 bp

Gene location (Mouse)
Chr.	Chromosome 8 (mouse)
Band	8 B3.3|8 34.21 cM	Start	71,261,093 bp
Band	8 B3.3|8 34.21 cM	End	71,274,068 bp
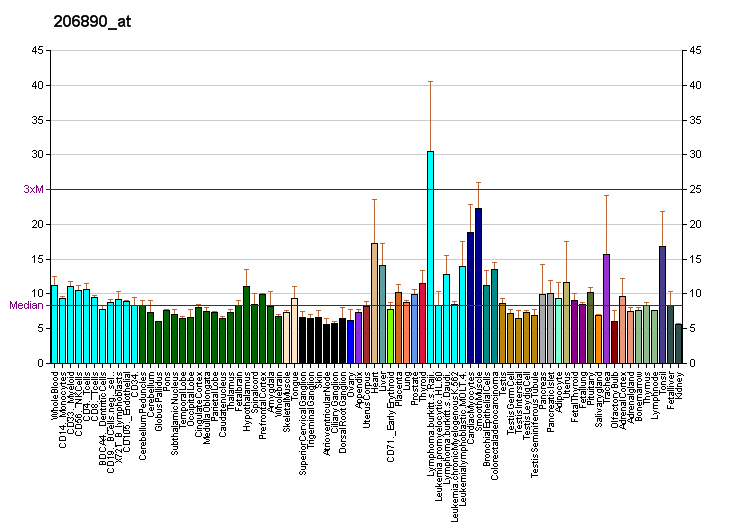
RNA expression pattern
Bgee	Human / Mouse (ortholog); Top expressed in: granulocyte; blood; monocyte; spleen; lymph node; appendix; buccal mucosa cell; amniotic fluid; palpebral conjunctiva; epithelium of nasopharynx / Top expressed in: appendicular skeleton; thymus; embryo; granulocyte; embryo; spleen; facial skeleton; jejunum; mandible; lesser wing of sphenoid bone; More reference expression data
BioGPS	More reference expression data
Gene ontology
Molecular function	interleukin-23 receptor activity; interleukin-12 receptor activity; interleukin-12 receptor binding; cytokine receptor activity; interleukin-23 binding; cytokine binding
Cellular component	integral component of membrane; interleukin-12 receptor complex; membrane; plasma membrane; interleukin-23 receptor complex; external side of plasma membrane; receptor complex
Biological process	cytokine-mediated signaling pathway; positive regulation of T cell mediated cytotoxicity; positive regulation of interferon-gamma production; positive regulation of T-helper 17 cell lineage commitment; positive regulation of T-helper 17 type immune response; positive regulation of T-helper 1 type immune response; positive regulation of memory T cell differentiation; cellular response to interferon-gamma; signal transduction; positive regulation of activated T cell proliferation; positive regulation of defense response to virus by host; interleukin-12-mediated signaling pathway; interleukin-23-mediated signaling pathway
Sources:Amigo / QuickGO
Orthologs
Databases	NCBI: entry; OMA: entry
Species	Human	Mouse
Entrez	3594	16161
Ensembl	ENSG00000096996	ENSMUSG00000000791
UniProt	P42701	Q60837
RefSeq (mRNA)	NM_001290023; NM_001290024; NM_005535; NM_153701	NM_008353
RefSeq (protein)	NP_001276952; NP_001276953; NP_005526; NP_714912	NP_032379
Location (UCSC)	Chr 19: 18.06 – 18.1 Mb	Chr 8: 71.26 – 71.27 Mb
PubMed search
- Wikidata
View/Edit Human	View/Edit Mouse

Interleukin-12 receptor, beta 1, or IL-12Rβ1 in short, is a subunit of the interleukin 12 receptor and the interleukin 23 receptor. IL12RB1, is the name of its human gene. IL-12Rβ1 is also known as CD212 (cluster of differentiation 212).

The protein encoded by this gene is a type I transmembrane protein that belongs to the hemopoietin receptor superfamily.

This protein binds to interleukin-12 (IL-12) with a low affinity, and is part of the IL-12 receptor complex. This protein forms a disulfide-linked oligomer, which is required for its IL-12 binding activity. The coexpression of this and IL-12Rβ2 protein was shown to lead to the formation of high-affinity IL-12 binding sites and reconstitution of IL-12 dependent signaling.

IL-12Rβ1 can also bind interleukin-23 (IL-23) as part of the IL-23 receptor complex. This complex forms a disulfide-linked oligomer, which is required for its IL-23 binding activity. The coexpression of this and IL-23R protein was shown to lead to the formation of IL-23 binding sites.

Various mutations in this gene were found to result in the immunodeficiency of patients with severe mycobacterial and Salmonella infections. Two alternatively spliced transcript variants of this gene encoding distinct isoforms have been reported.

All mutations known in the IL12RB1 gene, as well as many polymorphisms, have been collected in a mutation database
