= Interleukin =

Group of cytokines

Interleukins (ILs) are a group of cytokines (secreted proteins and signal molecules) that are expressed and secreted by white blood cells (leukocytes) as well as some other body cells. The human genome encodes more than 50 interleukins and related proteins.

The function of the immune system primarily depends on interleukins, and rare deficiencies of a number of them have been described, all featuring autoimmune diseases or immune deficiency. The majority of interleukins are synthesized by CD4 helper T-lymphocytes, as well as through monocytes, macrophages, and endothelial cells. They promote the development and differentiation of T and B lymphocytes, and hematopoietic cells.

Interleukin receptors on astrocytes in the hippocampus are also known to be involved in the development of spatial memories in mice.

== History and name ==
The name "interleukin" was chosen in 1979, to replace the various different names used by different research groups to designate interleukin 1 (lymphocyte activating factor, mitogenic protein, T-cell replacing factor III, B-cell activating factor, B-cell differentiation factor, and "Heidikine") and interleukin 2 (TSF, etc.). This decision was taken during the Second International Lymphokine Workshop in Switzerland (27–31 May 1979 in Ermatingen).

The term interleukin derives from (inter-) "as a means of communication", and (-leukin) "deriving from the fact that many of these proteins are produced by leukocytes and act on leukocytes". The name is something of a relic; it has since been found that interleukins are produced by a wide variety of body cells. The term was coined by Dr Vern Paetkau, University of Victoria.

Some interleukins are classified as lymphokines, lymphocyte-produced cytokines that mediate immune responses.

== Common families ==
=== Interleukin 1 ===
Interleukin 1 alpha and interleukin 1 beta (IL1 alpha and IL1 beta) are cytokines that participate in the regulation of immune responses, inflammatory reactions, and hematopoiesis. Two types of IL-1 receptor, each with three extracellular immunoglobulin (Ig)-like domains, limited sequence similarity (28%) and different pharmacological characteristics have been cloned from mouse and human cell lines: these have been termed type I and type II receptors. The receptors both exist in transmembrane (TM) and soluble forms: the soluble IL-1 receptor is thought to be post-translationally derived from cleavage of the extracellular portion of the membrane receptors.

Both IL-1 receptors (CD121a/IL1R1, CD121b/IL1R2) appear to be well conserved in evolution, and map to the same chromosomal location. The receptors can both bind all three forms of IL-1 (IL-1 alpha, IL-1 beta and IL-1 receptor antagonist).

The crystal structures of IL1A and IL1B have been solved, showing them to share the same 12-stranded beta-sheet structure as both the heparin binding growth factors and the Kunitz-type soybean trypsin inhibitors. The beta-sheets are arranged in 4 similar lobes around a central axis, 8 strands forming an anti-parallel beta-barrel. Several regions, especially the loop between strands 4 and 5, have been implicated in receptor binding.

Molecular cloning of the Interleukin 1 Beta converting enzyme is generated by the proteolytic cleavage of an inactive precursor molecule. A complementary DNA encoding protease that carries out this cleavage has been cloned. Recombinant expression enables cells to process precursor Interleukin 1 Beta to the mature form of the enzyme.

Interleukin 1 also plays a role in the central nervous system. Research indicates that mice with a genetic deletion of the type I IL-1 receptor display markedly impaired hippocampal-dependent memory functioning and long-term potentiation, although memories that do not depend on the integrity of the hippocampus seem to be spared. However, when mice with this genetic deletion have wild-type neural precursor cells injected into their hippocampus and these cells are allowed to mature into astrocytes containing the interleukin-1 receptors, the mice exhibit normal hippocampal-dependent memory function, and partial restoration of long-term potentiation.

=== Interleukin 2 ===
T lymphocytes regulate the growth and differentiation of T cells and certain B cells through the release of secreted protein factors. These factors, which include interleukin 2 (IL2), are secreted by lectin- or antigen-stimulated T cells, and have various physiological effects. IL2 is a lymphokine that induces the proliferation of responsive T cells. In addition, it acts on some B cells, via receptor-specific binding, as a growth factor and antibody production stimulant. The protein is secreted as a single glycosylated polypeptide, and cleavage of a signal sequence is required for its activity. Solution NMR suggests that the structure of IL2 comprises a bundle of 4 helices (termed A-D), flanked by 2 shorter helices and several poorly defined loops. Residues in helix A, and in the loop region between helices A and B, are important for receptor binding. Secondary structure analysis has suggested similarity to IL4 and granulocyte-macrophage colony stimulating factor (GMCSF).

=== Interleukin 3 ===
Interleukin 3 (IL3) is a cytokine that regulates hematopoiesis by controlling the production, differentiation and function of granulocytes and macrophages. The protein, which exists in vivo as a monomer, is produced in activated T cells and mast cells, and is activated by the cleavage of an N-terminal signal sequence.

IL3 is produced by T lymphocytes and T-cell lymphomas only after stimulation with antigens, mitogens, or chemical activators such as phorbol esters. However, IL3 is constitutively expressed in the myelomonocytic leukaemia cell line WEHI-3B. It is thought that the genetic change of the cell line to constitutive production of IL3 is the key event in development of this leukaemia.

=== Interleukin 4 ===
Interleukin 4 (IL4) is produced by CD4^{+} T cells specialized in providing help to B cells to proliferate and to undergo class switch recombination and somatic hypermutation. Th2 cells, through production of IL-4, have an important function in B-cell responses that involve class switch recombination to the IgG1 and IgE isotypes.

=== Interleukin 5 ===
Interleukin 5 (IL5), also known as eosinophil differentiation factor (EDF), is a lineage-specific cytokine for eosinophilpoiesis. It regulates eosinophil growth and activation, and thus plays an important role in diseases associated with increased levels of eosinophils, including asthma. IL5 has a similar overall fold to other cytokines (e.g., IL2, IL4 and GCSF), but while these exist as monomeric structures, IL5 is a homodimer. The fold contains an anti-parallel 4-alpha-helix bundle with a left handed twist, connected by a 2-stranded anti-parallel beta-sheet. The monomers are held together by 2 interchain disulphide bonds.

=== Interleukin 6 ===
Interleukin 6 (IL6), also referred to as B-cell stimulatory factor-2 (BSF-2) and interferon beta-2, is a cytokine involved in a wide variety of biological functions. It plays an essential role in the final differentiation of B cells into immunoglobulin-secreting cells, as well as inducing myeloma/plasmacytoma growth, nerve cell differentiation, and, in hepatocytes, acute-phase reactants.

A number of other cytokines may be grouped with IL6 on the basis of sequence similarity. These include granulocyte colony-stimulating factor (GCSF) and myelomonocytic growth factor (MGF). GCSF acts in hematopoiesis by affecting the production, differentiation, and function of two related white cell groups in the blood. MGF also acts in hematopoiesis, stimulating proliferation and colony formation of normal and transformed avian cells of the myeloid lineage.

Cytokines of the IL6/GCSF/MGF family are glycoproteins of about 170 to 180 amino acid residues that contain four conserved cysteine residues involved in two disulphide bonds. They have a compact, globular fold (similar to other interleukins), stabilised by the two disulphide bonds. One half of the structure is dominated by a 4-alpha-helix bundle with a left-handed twist; the helices are anti-parallel, with two overhand connections, which fall into a double-stranded anti-parallel beta-sheet. The fourth alpha-helix is important to the biological activity of the molecule.

=== Interleukin 7 ===
Interleukin 7 (IL-7) is a cytokine that serves as a growth factor for early lymphoid cells of both B- and T-cell lineages.

=== Interleukin 8 ===
Interleukin 8 is a chemokine produced by macrophages and other cell types such as epithelial cells, airway smooth muscle cells and endothelial cells. Endothelial cells store IL-8 in their storage vesicles, the Weibel-Palade bodies. In humans, the interleukin-8 protein is encoded by the CXCL8 gene. IL-8 is initially produced as a precursor peptide of 99 amino acids which then undergoes cleavage to create several active IL-8 isoforms. In culture, a 72 amino acid peptide is the major form secreted by macrophages.

There are many receptors on the surface membrane capable of binding IL-8; the most frequently studied types are the G protein-coupled serpentine receptors CXCR1 and CXCR2. Expression and affinity for IL-8 differs between the two receptors (CXCR1 > CXCR2). Through a chain of biochemical reactions, IL-8 is secreted and is an important mediator of the immune reaction in the innate immune system response.

=== Interleukin 9 ===
Interleukin 9 (IL-9) is a cytokine that supports IL-2 independent and IL-4 independent growth of helper T cells. Early studies had indicated that Interleukin 9 and 7 seem to be evolutionary related and Pfam, InterPro and PROSITE entries exist for interleukin 7/interleukin 9 family. However, a recent study has shown that IL-9 is, in fact, much closer to both IL-2 and IL-15, than to IL-7. Moreover, the study showed irreconcilable structural differences between IL-7 and all the remaining cytokines signalling through the γc receptor ( IL-2, IL-4, IL-7, IL-9, IL-15 and IL-21).

=== Interleukin 10 ===
Interleukin 10 (IL-10) is a protein that inhibits the synthesis of a number of cytokines, including IFN-gamma, IL-2, IL-3, TNF, and GM-CSF produced by activated macrophages and by helper T cells. In structure, IL-10 is a protein of about 160 amino acids that contains four conserved cysteines involved in disulphide bonds. IL-10 is highly similar to the Human herpesvirus 4 (Epstein-Barr virus) BCRF1 protein, which inhibits the synthesis of gamma-interferon and to Equid herpesvirus 2 (Equine herpesvirus 2) protein E7. It is also similar, but to a lesser degree, with human protein mda-7. a protein that has antiproliferative properties in human melanoma cells. Mda-7 contains only two of the four cysteines of IL-10.

=== Interleukin 11 ===
Interleukin 11 (IL-11) is a secreted protein that stimulates megakaryocytopoiesis, initially thought to lead to an increased production of platelets (it has since been shown to be redundant to normal platelet formation), as well as activating osteoclasts, inhibiting epithelial cell proliferation and apoptosis, and inhibiting macrophage mediator production. These functions may be particularly important in mediating the hematopoietic, osseous and mucosal protective effects of interleukin 11.

=== Interleukin 12 ===
Interleukin 12 (IL-12) is a disulphide-bonded heterodimer consisting of a 35kDa alpha subunit and a 40kDa beta subunit. It is involved in the stimulation and maintenance of Th1 cellular immune responses, including the normal host defence against various intracellular pathogens, such as Leishmania, Toxoplasma, Measles virus, and Human immunodeficiency virus 1 (HIV). IL-12 also has an important role in enhancing the cytotoxic function of NK cells and role in pathological Th1 responses, such as in inflammatory bowel disease and multiple sclerosis. Suppression of IL-12 activity in such diseases may have therapeutic benefit. On the other hand, administration of recombinant IL-12 may have therapeutic benefit in conditions associated with pathological Th2 responses.

=== Interleukin 13 ===
Interleukin 13 (IL-13) is a pleiotropic cytokine that may be important in the regulation of the inflammatory and immune responses. It inhibits inflammatory cytokine production and synergises with IL-2 in regulating interferon-gamma synthesis. The sequences of IL-4 and IL-13 are distantly related.

=== Interleukin 15 ===
Interleukin 15 (IL-15) is a cytokine that possesses a variety of biological functions, including stimulation and maintenance of cellular immune responses. IL-15 stimulates the proliferation of T lymphocytes, which requires interaction of IL-15 with IL-15R alpha and components of IL-2R, including IL-2R beta and IL-2R gamma (common gamma chain, γc), but not IL-2R alpha.

=== Interleukin 17 ===
Interleukin 17 (IL-17) is a potent proinflammatory cytokine produced by activated memory T cells. This cytokine is characterized by its proinflammatory properties, role in recruiting neutrophils, and importance in innate and adaptive immunity. Not only does IL-17 play a key role in inflammation of many autoimmune diseases, such as RA, allergies, asthma, psoriasis, and more, but it also plays a key role in the pathogenesis of these diseases. Additionally, some studies have found that IL-17 plays a role in tumorigenesis (initial formation of a tumor) and transplant rejection. The IL-17 family is thought to represent a distinct signaling system that appears to have been highly conserved across vertebrate evolution.

== In humans ==
Name	Source	Targets		Function
Name	Source	Receptors	Cells	Function
IL-1	macrophages, B cells, monocytes, dendritic cells	CD121a/IL1R1, CD121b/IL1R2	T helper cells	co-stimulation
IL-1	macrophages, B cells, monocytes, dendritic cells	CD121a/IL1R1, CD121b/IL1R2	B cells	maturation and proliferation
IL-1	macrophages, B cells, monocytes, dendritic cells	CD121a/IL1R1, CD121b/IL1R2	NK cells	activation
IL-1	macrophages, B cells, monocytes, dendritic cells	CD121a/IL1R1, CD121b/IL1R2	macrophages, endothelium, other	inflammation, small amounts induce acute phase reaction, large amounts induce fever
IL-2	Th1-cells	CD25/IL2RA, CD122/IL2RB, CD132/IL2RG	activated T cells and B cells, NK cells, macrophages, oligodendrocytes	stimulates growth and differentiation of T cell response. Can be used in immunotherapy to treat cancer or suppressed for transplant patients. Has also been used in clinical trials (ESPIRIT. Stalwart) to raise CD4 counts in HIV positive patients.
IL-3	activated T helper cells, mast cells, NK cells, endothelium, eosinophils	CD123/IL3RA, CD131/IL3RB	hematopoietic stem cells	differentiation and proliferation of myeloid progenitor cells to e.g. erythrocytes, granulocytes
IL-3	activated T helper cells, mast cells, NK cells, endothelium, eosinophils	CD123/IL3RA, CD131/IL3RB	mast cells	growth and histamine release
IL-4	Th2 cells, just activated naive CD4+ cell, memory CD4+ cells, mast cells, macrophages	CD124/IL4R, CD132/IL2RG	activated B cells	proliferation and differentiation, IgG1 and IgE synthesis. Important role in allergic response (IgE)
IL-4	Th2 cells, just activated naive CD4+ cell, memory CD4+ cells, mast cells, macrophages	CD124/IL4R, CD132/IL2RG	T cells	proliferation
IL-4	Th2 cells, just activated naive CD4+ cell, memory CD4+ cells, mast cells, macrophages	CD124/IL4R, CD132/IL2RG	endothelium	increase expression of vascular cell adhesion molecule (VCAM-1) promoting adhesion of lymphocytes.
IL-5	Th2 cells, mast cells, eosinophils	CD125/IL5RA, CD131/IL3RB	eosinophils	production
IL-5	Th2 cells, mast cells, eosinophils	CD125/IL5RA, CD131/IL3RB	B cells	differentiation, IgA production
IL-6	macrophages, Th2 cells, B cells, astrocytes, endothelium	CD126/IL6RA, CD130/IL6RB	activated B cells	differentiation into plasma cells
IL-6	macrophages, Th2 cells, B cells, astrocytes, endothelium	CD126/IL6RA, CD130/IL6RB	plasma cells	antibody secretion
IL-6	macrophages, Th2 cells, B cells, astrocytes, endothelium	CD126/IL6RA, CD130/IL6RB	hematopoietic stem cells	differentiation
IL-6	macrophages, Th2 cells, B cells, astrocytes, endothelium	CD126/IL6RA, CD130/IL6RB	T cells, others	induces acute phase reaction, hematopoiesis, differentiation, inflammation
IL-7	Bone marrow stromal cells and thymus stromal cells	CD127/IL7RA, CD132/IL2RG	pre/pro-B cell, pre/pro-T cell, NK cells	differentiation and proliferation of lymphoid progenitor cells, involved in B, T, and NK cell survival, development, and homeostasis, ↑proinflammatory cytokines
IL-8 or CXCL8	macrophages, lymphocytes, epithelial cells, endothelial cells	CXCR1/IL8RA, CXCR2/IL8RB/CD128	neutrophils, basophils, lymphocytes	Neutrophil chemotaxis
IL-9	Th2 cells, specifically by CD4+ helper cells	CD129/IL9R	T cells, B cells	Potentiates IgM, IgG, IgE, stimulates mast cells
IL-10	monocytes, Th2 cells, CD8+ T cells, mast cells, macrophages, B cell subset	CD210/IL10RA, CDW210B/IL10RB	macrophages	cytokine production
IL-10	monocytes, Th2 cells, CD8+ T cells, mast cells, macrophages, B cell subset	CD210/IL10RA, CDW210B/IL10RB	B cells	activation
IL-10	monocytes, Th2 cells, CD8+ T cells, mast cells, macrophages, B cell subset	CD210/IL10RA, CDW210B/IL10RB	mast cells	
IL-10	monocytes, Th2 cells, CD8+ T cells, mast cells, macrophages, B cell subset	CD210/IL10RA, CDW210B/IL10RB	Th1 cells	inhibits Th1 cytokine production (IFN-γ, TNF-β, IL-2)
IL-10	monocytes, Th2 cells, CD8+ T cells, mast cells, macrophages, B cell subset	CD210/IL10RA, CDW210B/IL10RB	Th2 cells	Stimulation
IL-11	bone marrow stroma	IL11RA	bone marrow stroma	acute phase protein production, osteoclast formation
IL-12	dendritic cells, B cells, T cells, macrophages	CD212/IL12RB1, IR12RB2	activated T cells,	differentiation into Cytotoxic T cells with IL-2, ↑ IFN-γ, TNF-α, ↓ IL-10
IL-12	dendritic cells, B cells, T cells, macrophages	CD212/IL12RB1, IR12RB2	NK cells	↑ IFN-γ, TNF-α
IL-13	activated Th2 cells, mast cells, NK cells	IL13R	Th2 cells, B cells, macrophages	Stimulates growth and differentiation of B cells (IgE), inhibits Th1 cells and the production of macrophage inflammatory cytokines (e.g. IL-1, IL-6), ↓ IL-8, IL-10, IL-12
IL-14	T cells and certain malignant B cells		activated B cells	controls the growth and proliferation of B cells, inhibits Ig secretion
IL-15	mononuclear phagocytes (and some other cells), especially macrophages following infection by virus(es)	IL15RA	T cells, activated B cells	Induces production of Natural killer cells
IL-16	lymphocytes, epithelial cells, eosinophils, CD8+ T cells	CD4	CD4+ T cells (Th-cells)	CD4+ chemoattractant
IL-17	T helper 17 cells (Th17)	CDw217/IL17RA, IL17RB	epithelium, endothelium, other	osteoclastogenesis, angiogenesis, ↑ pro-inflammatory cytokines
IL-18	macrophages	CDw218a/IL18R1	Th1 cells, NK cells	Induces production of IFN-γ, ↑ NK cell activity
IL-19	-	IL20R		-
IL-20	Activated keratinocytes and monocytes	IL20R		regulates proliferation and differentiation of keratinocytes
IL-21	activated T helper cells, NKT cells	IL21R	All lymphocytes, dendritic cells	costimulates activation and proliferation of CD8+ T cells, augment NK cytotoxicity, augments CD40-driven B cell proliferation, differentiation and isotype switching, promotes differentiation of Th17 cells
IL-22	T helper 17 cells (Th17)	IL22R		Production of defensins from epithelial cells. Activates STAT1 and STAT3 and increases production of acute phase proteins such as serum amyloid A, Alpha 1-antichymotrypsin and haptoglobin in hepatoma cell lines
IL-23	macrophages, dendritic cells	IL23R		Maintenance of IL-17 producing cells, increases angiogenesis but reduces CD8 T-cell infiltration
IL-24	melanocytes, keratinocytes, monocytes, T cells	IL20R		Plays important roles in tumor suppression, wound healing and psoriasis by influencing cell survival, inflammatory cytokine expression.
IL-25	T Cells, mast cells, eosinophils, macrophages, mucosal epithelial cells	LY6E		Induces the production IL-4, IL-5 and IL-13, which stimulate eosinophil expansion
IL-26	T cells, monocytes	IL20R1		Enhances secretion of IL-10 and IL-8 and cell surface expression of CD54 on epithelial cells
IL-27	macrophages, dendritic cells	IL27RA		Regulates the activity of B lymphocyte and T lymphocytes
IL-28	-	IL28R		Plays a role in immune defense against viruses
IL-29	-			Plays a role in host defenses against microbes
IL-30	-			Forms one chain of IL-27
IL-31	Th2 cells	IL31RA		May play a role in inflammation of the skin
IL-32	-			Induces monocytes and macrophages to secrete TNF-α, IL-8 and CXCL2
IL-33	epithelial cells			Induces helper T cells to produce type 2 cytokine
IL-35	regulatory T cells			Suppression of T helper cell activation
IL-36	-			Regulates DC and T cell responses

== International nonproprietary names for analogues and derivatives ==
Endogenous form name	Pharmaceutical form INN suffix	INNs
interleukin-1 (IL-1)	-nakin	
interleukin-1α (IL-1α)	-onakin	pifonakin
interleukin-1β (IL-1β)	-benakin	mobenakin
interleukin-2 (IL-2)	-leukin	adargileukin alfa, aldesleukin, celmoleukin, denileukin diftitox, pegaldesleukin, teceleukin, tucotuzumab celmoleukin
interleukin-3 (IL-3)	-plestim	daniplestim, muplestim
interleukin-4 (IL-4)	-trakin	binetrakin
interleukin-6 (IL-6)	-exakin	atexakin alfa
interleukin-8 (IL-8)	-octakin	emoctakin
interleukin-10 (IL-10)	-decakin	ilodecakin
interleukin-11 (IL-11)	-elvekin	oprelvekin
interleukin-12 (IL-12)	-dodekin	edodekin alfa
interleukin-13 (IL-13)	-tredekin	cintredekin besudotox
interleukin-18 (IL-18)	-octadekin	iboctadekin
