= Interleukin-20 receptor =

Type of receptor

interleukin 20 receptor, alpha

Identifiers
- Symbol: IL20RA
- Alt. symbols: ZCYTOR7, IL-20R1
- NCBI gene: 53832
- HGNC: 6003
- OMIM: 605620
- RefSeq: NM_014432
- UniProt: Q9UHF4

Other data
- Locus: Chr. 6 q23.3
Search for
- Structures: Swiss-model
- Domains: InterPro

interleukin 20 receptor beta

Identifiers
- Symbol: IL20RB
- Alt. symbols: FNDC6
- NCBI gene: 53833
- HGNC: 6004
- OMIM: 605621
- RefSeq: NM_144717
- UniProt: Q6UXL0

Other data
- Locus: Chr. 3 q22.3
Search for
- Structures: Swiss-model
- Domains: InterPro

Interleukin 20 receptors (IL20R) belong to the IL-10 family. IL20R are involved in both pro-inflammatory and anti-inflammatory immune response. There are two types of IL20R: Type I and Type II.

IL20R is found in many organ resident effector cells such as keratinocytes at the skin epidermis, osteoclasts, found in bones, and epithelial cells of the intestine and trachea. IL20R alpha and beta subunits have also been found in some immune cells. IL20R is implicated in diseases such as psoriasis, rheumatoid arthritis, and glaucoma.

== Structure and function ==
There are two types of IL20R: Type I, made up of the IL-20 receptor alpha subunit and beta subunit, and Type II, made up of the IL-22 receptor and IL-20 receptor beta subunit. Both types of receptor bind the cytokines IL-20, IL-24. Type 1 also binds cytokine IL-19.

== Signaling ==
IL20R signalling happens through the JAK-STAT pathway. When an IL-20 subfamily cytokine binds IL20R, JAK's linked to intracellular domains of IL20R activate and phosphorylate tyrosine residues found in the longer alpha chains in the intracellular portion of the receptor. STAT then binds to docking sites created by JAK phosphorylation, and become phosphorylated by JAK's themselves. STATs then dimerize and move to the nucleus to act as transcription factors. The specific genes expressed are dependent on the specific JAK, STAT, as well as by SOCS proteins, which inhibit the JAK-STAT signal to regulate it.

STAT3 is the main transcription factor activated with IL20R signaling.

== The Immune System and Link to Disease ==
IL20R subunit gene mutations and differences in gene expression are associated with an increased risk of inflammatory diseases.

=== IL20R and Psoriasis ===
IL20R has is involved in skin homeostasis. Research shows that IL-20R may play a role in the immune disease psoriasis, where rapid growth of skin cells leads to dryness and irritation. Mutations in IL20R are associated with an increased risk of psoriasis, and psoriatic skin lesions show elevated levels of IL20R.

Under the current understanding of psoriasis, the over-activation of dendritic cells and macrophages leads to pro-inflammatory cytokine release, including TNFα and IL-23. This cytokine release activates T-helper cells, which produce cytokines IL-17 and IL-22, and subsequently leads to the release of IL-19 IL-20, and IL-24. The binding of IL-20, IL-24, and IL-19 to IL20R, along with other cytokines binding to their respective receptors, leads to high amounts of keratinocytes. The keratinocytes then lead to psoriatic plaque formation.

=== Rheumatoid arthritis ===
IL20R is linked with rheumatoid arthritis, an autoimmune condition where the immune system attacks joints and other body areas and leads to pain. Elevated levels of IL20R mRNA and proteins are found in people with rheumatoid arthritis. It is thought that production of IL20 which binds to IL20Rs increases the production of chemoattractants, which are immune signaling molecules that can recruit immune cells. The chemoattractants then attract neutrophils and T-cells, which drive inflammation in the joints and cause pain.

Research also shows that certain gene mutations in IL20R are associated with an increased risk of juvenile idiopathic arthritis.

=== Glaucoma ===
Research indicates that IL20Rs, specifically the IL20R beta subunit (IL20RB), may be linked with glaucoma, a disease that can lead to blindness. It's not believed that IL20RB has a causative effect on the disease, but it may contribute to an increased risk of the disease, along with other factors, such as intraocular pressure.
