= IL22RA2 =

Protein found in humans

Identifiers
- Aliases: IL22RA2, CRF2-10, CRF2-S1, CRF2X, IL-22BP, IL-22R-alpha-2, IL-22RA2, ZCYTOR16, interleukin 22 receptor subunit alpha 2
- External IDs: OMIM: 606648; MGI: 2665114; GeneCards: IL22RA2
Available structures
PDB	Ortholog search: PDBe RCSB
PDB	List of PDB id codes 3G9V

Gene location (Human)
Chr.	Chromosome 6 (human)
Band	6q23.3	Start	137,143,820 bp
Band	6q23.3	End	137,173,648 bp

Gene location (Mouse)
Chr.	Chromosome 10 (mouse)
Band	10|10 A3	Start	19,497,746 bp
Band	10|10 A3	End	19,510,429 bp
RNA expression pattern
Bgee	Human / Mouse (ortholog); Top expressed in: appendix; epithelium of nasopharynx; lymph node; rectum; placenta; tonsil; palpebral conjunctiva; duodenum; mammary gland; lactiferous gland / Top expressed in: mesenteric lymph nodes; morula; subcutaneous adipose tissue; skin of external ear; left colon; jejunum; skin of back; granulocyte; mammary gland; skin of abdomen; More reference expression data
BioGPS	n/a
Gene ontology
Molecular function	interleukin-22 receptor activity; interleukin-22 binding; cytokine receptor activity
Cellular component	integral component of membrane; cytosol; plasma membrane; extracellular region; extracellular space
Biological process	negative regulation of inflammatory response; regulation of tyrosine phosphorylation of STAT protein; cytokine-mediated signaling pathway
Sources:Amigo / QuickGO
Orthologs
Databases	NCBI: entry; OMA: entry
Species	Human	Mouse
Entrez	116379	237310
Ensembl	ENSG00000164485	ENSMUSG00000039760
UniProt	Q969J5	Q80XF5
RefSeq (mRNA)	NM_181310; NM_052962; NM_181309	NM_178258
RefSeq (protein)	NP_443194; NP_851826; NP_851827	NP_839989
Location (UCSC)	Chr 6: 137.14 – 137.17 Mb	Chr 10: 19.5 – 19.51 Mb
PubMed search
- Wikidata
View/Edit Human	View/Edit Mouse

Interleukin-22 receptor subunit alpha-2 (IL-22RA2), also known as interleukin-22 binding protein (IL-22BP) is a naturally secreted monomeric protein acting as an interleukin-22 (IL-22) antagonist with inhibitory effects on IL-22 activity in vivo. IL-22BP is in humans encoded by the IL22RA2 gene located on chromosome 6, and in mice is encoded by the il22ra2 gene located on chromosome 10. IL-22BP belongs to the class II cytokine receptor family and it is a soluble receptor homolog of IL-22R (aliases IL-22RA1/IL-22RA/IL-22R1).

The main function of IL-22BP is the regulation of IL-22 biological activity through specific binding which blocks the interaction of IL-22 with its cell surface receptor IL-22R and thus prevents the downstream cellular signalling and response. IL-22 and IL-22BP interactions play an important role in health and disease and are involved in the regulation of steady-state homeostasis, inflammatory responses and cancer.

== Structure and interaction ==
IL-22BP is a soluble monomeric cytokine receptor protein. IL-22BP shares approximately 34% sequence homology with the extracellular domain of one subunit of the heterodimeric membrane-bound IL-22R, which is the main cellular receptor for IL-22 providing the subsequent signalling. This homology extends to the secondary and tertiary structure of the proteins allowing specific binding and protein-protein interactions. IL-22BP also shares homology with other related cytokine receptors IL-10RB, and IL-20RA. IL-22BP is a secreted protein that lacks both transmembrane and intracellular domains, it contains two tandem fibronectin-III domains, glycosylation sites and four conserved cysteine residues. The molecular mass of secreted IL-22BP is approximately 30 kDa.

IL-22BP with its five binding loops contacts IL-22 at the site overlapping the IL-22R binding site, successfully blocking the IL-22-IL-22R interaction. The dissociation constant K_{D} for IL-22-IL-22BP is ~ 1 pM highlighting very tight interaction and high affinity, whereas K_{D} for IL-22-IL-22R is only ~ 20 nM meaning much lower affinity. Also, the K_{off} dissociation rate for the IL22BP-IL-22 complex is over 4 days but K_{off} dissociation rate for the IL-22R-IL-22 complex is only a few minutes. These chemical properties ensure that IL-22 which is bound to IL-22BP is effectively sequestered from interaction with IL-22R.

== Function and regulation ==
Similarly to the expression profile of IL-22, IL-22BP is expressed in lymphoid and barrier tissues such as the spleen, mesenteric lymph nodes, gastrointestinal tract, skin, lungs, and liver among others. IL-22BP is produced by dendritic cells, particularly by specialised intestinal dendritic cell populations. Other identified cellular sources of IL-22BP include eosinophils, CD4+ T_{H} lymphocytes and keratinocytes.

The detailed role of IL-22BP-IL-22 interactions is so far the best described in the gastrointestinal tract, where IL-22BP helps to maintain homeostasis and tolerance regulating IL-22 bioavailability. In the gastrointestinal tract, the levels of these two molecules are inverse during different immunological conditions. In healthy, steady-state homeostasis, the levels of IL-22BP are the highest and decrease rapidly during immune response and inflammation when high levels of IL-22 are produced. Inflammation mediators such as prostaglandin E2 (PGE2), IL-18 and other inflammasome components are known to downregulate IL-22BP production, on the other hand, the presence of retinoic acid, metabolite of vitamin A, is known to induce IL-22BP secretion. IL-22BP in the gut is also involved in enabling proper antigen sampling from the intestinal lumen to intestinal lymphoid tissues, which is crucial for maintaining tolerance and homeostasis. Further IL-22BP regulates lipid adsorption and proliferation of intestinal epithelial cells.

To a less extent, the function of IL-22BP is described in other tissues such as skin, lungs and liver. In most of these tissues, IL-22BP is thought to have protective effects. However, as it regulates the dual-natured IL-22 cytokine, which can have both protective and pathological effects, IL-22BP can also have both pro- and anti-inflammatory effects depending on many various conditions and stimuli. The detailed role and involvement of IL-22BP in the health and disease of different tissues remain to be fully explained.

== Disease and therapy ==
As the function of IL-22BP implies, in general, the presence of IL-22BP has a positive/protective effect on the diseases that are exacerbated by IL-22 activity and vice versa. Dysfunctional IL-22BP-IL-22 interactions have been among other molecules linked to the development inflammatory diseases of the gastrointestinal tract such as inflammatory bowel disease (IBD) and its components Crohn's disease (CD) and ulcerative colitis (UC). It was reported that IBD patients harbour elevated levels of both IL-22BP and IL-22 when compared to healthy controls, suggesting that in the context of chronic inflammation the effects of these molecules can be dramatically changed from the healthy state. Another research study working with il22ra2 knockout mouse model pointed out protective role of IL-22BP in the tumorigenesis of colorectal cancer (CRC) as animals of this genotype had increased tumour formation when compared to wild-type controls. In addition to these observations, it has also been proposed that the anti-tumour effects of lymphotoxin α and β could be mediated in IL-22BP dependent manner.

In lung infection studies with influenza virus and Streptococcus pneumoniae the observed effects of IL-22BP were mostly negative and exacerbated infection-induced pneumonia due to reduced levels of active protective IL-22 on epithelial tight junctions and antimicrobial peptides secretion. In mice with experimental autoimmune encephalomyelitis (EAE) which is a model of multiple sclerosis (MS) negative effects of IL-22BP on the disease progression were observed, partially due to insufficient repression of pro-inflammatory IFNγ levels by neutralised IL-22.

IL-22 is a target molecule for the development of novel therapies to treat chronic inflammatory diseases in which the IL-22 biological pathway is thought to be involved, such as the UC, acute graft versus host disease (GVHD), psoriasis and COVID-19 among others. Targeting IL-22BP biology in these therapies can also be beneficial, for example, the use of IL-22BP in a similar fashion as manufactured neutralizing monoclonal antibodies against IL-22 is being studied. Novel research is pointing in the direction of using IL-22BP as a potential biomarker for CRC and anti-TNFα IBD therapy prognosis.
