= Hyper-IL-6 =

Designer cytokine

Hyper-IL-6 is a designer cytokine, which was generated by the German biochemist Stefan Rose-John. Hyper-IL-6 is a fusion protein of the four-helical cytokine Interleukin-6 and the soluble Interleukin-6 receptor which are covalently linked by a flexible peptide linker. Interleukin-6 on target cells binds to a membrane bound Interleukin-6 receptor. The complex of Interleukin-6 and the Interleukin-6 receptor associate with a second receptor protein called gp130, which dimerises and initiates intracellular signal transduction. Gp130 is expressed on all cells of the human body whereas the Interleukin-6 receptor is only found on few cells such as hepatocytes and some leukocytes. Neither Interleukin-6 nor the Interleukin-6 receptor have a measurable affinity for gp130. Therefore, cells, which only express gp130 but no Interleukin-6 receptor are not responsive to Interleukin-6. It was found, however, that the membrane-bound Interleukin-6 receptor can be cleaved from the cell membrane generating a soluble Interleukin-6 receptor. The soluble Interleukin-6 receptor can bind the ligand Interleukin-6 with similar affinity as the membrane-bound Interleukin-6 receptor and the complex of Interleukin-6 and the soluble Interleukin-6 receptor can bind to gp130 on cells, which only express gp130 but no Interleukin-6 receptor. The mode of signaling via the soluble Interleukin-6 receptor has been named Interleukin-6 trans-signaling whereas Interleukin-6 signaling via the membrane-bound Interleukin-6 receptor is referred to as Interleukin-6 classic signaling. Therefore, the generation of the soluble Interleukin-6 receptor enables cells to respond to Interleukin-6, which in the absence of soluble Interleukin-6 receptor would be completely unresponsive to the cytokine.

== Molecular construction of Hyper-IL-6 ==
In order to generate a molecular tool to discriminate between Interleukin-6 classic signaling and Interleukin-6 trans-signaling, a cDNA coding for human Interleukin-6 and a cDNA coding for the human soluble Interleukin-6 receptor were connected by a cDNA coding for a 13 amino acids long linker, which was long enough to bridge the 40 Å distance between the COOH terminus of the soluble Interleukin-6 receptor and the NH2 terminus of human Interleukin-6. The generated cDNA was expressed in yeast cells and in mammalian cells and it was shown that.

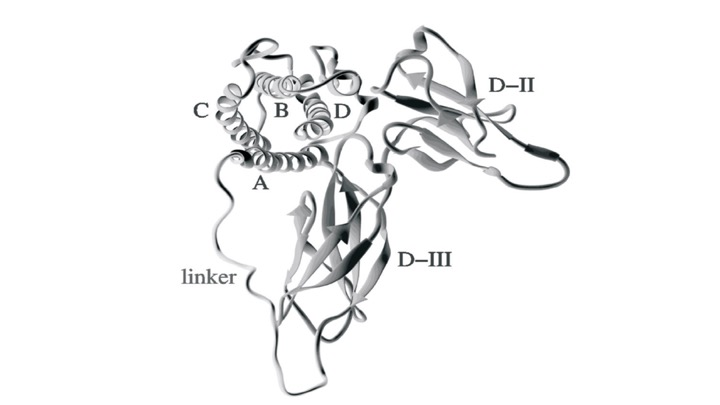

== Use of Hyper-IL-6 to analyse IL-6 signaling ==
Hyper-IL-6 has been used to test which cells depend on Interleukin-6 trans-signaling in their response to the cytokine Interleukin-6. To this end, cells were treated with Interleukin-6 and alternatively with Hyper-IL-6. Cells, which respond to Interleukin-6 alone do express an Interleukin-6 receptor whereas cells, which only respond to Hyper-IL-6 but not to Interleukin-6 alone depend in their response to the cytokine on Interleukin-6 trans-signaling. It turned out that hematopoietic stem cells, neural cells, smooth muscle cells and endothelial cells are typical target cells of Interleukin-6 trans-signaling.

== The concept of Interleukin-6 trans-signaling ==
The Hyper-IL-6 protein has also been used to explore the physiologic role of Interleukin-6 trans-signaling in vivo. It turned out that this signaling mode was involved in many types of inflammation and cancer.

Hyper-IL-6 has helped to establish the concept of Interleukin-6 trans-signaling. Interleukin-6 trans-signaling mediates the pro-inflammatory activities of Interleukin-6 whereas Interleukin-6 classic signaling governs the protective and regenerative Interleukin-6 activities. Recently, in breast cancer patient cells, it was shown with the help of Hyper-IL-6 that IL-6 trans-signaling via phosphoinositid-3-kinase signaling activates disseminated cancer cells long before metastases are formed. In addition, it was demonstrated in mice that Hyper-IL-6 transneuronal delivery enabled functional recovery after severe spinal cord injury.
