= IL-10 family =

Family of interleukins

The IL-10 family is a family of interleukins. They are helical cytokines categorized based on their specific similarities and can be classified as class 2 cytokines.

In addition to IL-10, it includes IL-19, IL-20, IL-22, IL-24 and IL-26.

Some sources also include the type III interferons IL-28 and IL-29.

== Classification ==
It is well-accepted interferons are class 2 cytokines just like the IL-10 family members, but their precise relationship is unknown due to difficulties in rooting the tree.

Phylogenies
Typical midpoint rooting

- - - Type IV IFN
    - Type I IFN
  - - Type II IFN
    - - Type III IFN
      - - IL-22
        - - IL-20
          - IL-10

Interleukins as outgroup

- - - - - - Type I IFN
          - Type IV IFN
        - Type III IFN
      - Jawless IFN
    - - Type II IFN
      - Lancelet IFN
  - - IL-22
    - - - - IL-20
          - IL-19
        - IL-24
      - - IL-26
        - IL-10

The receptors and signaling functions are:

Cytokines	Receptor α	Receptor β	Stat molecule	Additional partners
IL-10	IL-10RA	IL-10RB	Stat3, Stat1, Stat5	
IL-19/20/24	IL-20RA	IL-20RB	Stat3, Stat5	
IL-20/24	IL-22R	IL-20RB	Stat3, Stat5	
IL-22	IL-22R	IL-10RB	Stat3, Stat1, Stat5	IL-22BP (antagonist)
IL-26	IL-20RA	IL-10RB	Stat3, Stat1	
IL-28A/28B/29	IL-28R	IL-10RB	Stat1, Stat2	

Based on the functions of the cytokine, the IL-10 family is traditionally separated into three subfamily groups:

- IL-10 (only member of its subfamily) selects the innate and adaptive immune response and can prevent the function to reduce tissue damage.
- The IL-20 subfamily (IL-19, IL-20, IL-22, IL-24, IL-26) of cytokine works on tissues in the stroma and epithelial cells to bring out the mechanism of innate defense that manages the attack of extracellular pathogens.
- The IL-28 subfamily of cytokine are type III interferon (IFN) family. This subfamily share intersecting biology and signaling pathways with type I IFN family cytokines but the difference is that the type III INF family cytokines prefer to target the tissues of the epithelial cell.

== Biological activity ==
The IL-10 family is one of the important types of cytokines, that can stop the inflammation. In general. these cytokines have a helical structure of homodimers. The difference that the members of IL-10 family have between each other is that they have various receptor-binding residues, which help with interaction with specific cytokine receptors. The features of the IL-10 family consists of their genomic structure being similar, their primary and secondary protein structures being similar, their a clustering of encoding genes, and their utilization the similar receptor complexes.

=== IL-10 ===
Interleukin 10 is produced by regulatory T lymphocytes, B cells, and monocytes. It is a homodimer that functions through the IL-10R1 and IL-10R2 receptor complexes, activating such kinases as Janus kinase and tyrosine kinase 2. IL-10R2 receptor is presented in most cells, when IL-10R1 receptor is IL-10 is also an inhibitor of expressions of CD80 and CD86 by dendritic cells (DC) and antigen-presenting cells (APC), and of T cells, decreasing their cytokine production, therefore, controlling their activation. IL-10 plays a big role in regulating allergies by inhibiting cytokines responsible for allergic inflammation.

=== IL-19 ===
Interleukin 19 is produced mainly in monocytes, and can be found in big concentrations in patients with allergic disorders and psoriasis. IL-19 plays a big role in the CNS by regulating the inflammation process through a delayed production of it.

=== IL-20 ===
IL-20 - induces cheratin proliferation and Stat-3 signal transduction pathway; is expressed in the CNS, myeloid cells, and keratinocytes. When IL-20 is inhibited in the CNS can stop such inflammations as acute ischemic brain injury.

=== IL-22 ===
IL-22 mediates inflammation and binds class II cytokine receptor heterodimers IL-22 RA1/CRF2-4; is involved in immuno-regulatory responses

=== IL-24 ===
IL-24 produced by activated monocytes and T-cells.

=== IL-26 ===
IL-26 is a newly discovered cytokine produced by memory T cells and monocytes. IL-26 assist with the process of human T cell transformation after their infections.
