= Interleukin 20 receptor, beta subunit =

Protein-coding gene in the species Homo sapiens

IL20RB

Identifiers
- Aliases: IL20RB, DIRS1, FNDC6, IL-20R2, Interleukin 20 receptor, beta subunit, interleukin 20 receptor subunit beta
- External IDs: OMIM: 605621; MGI: 2143266; GeneCards: IL20RB
Available structures
PDB	Ortholog search: PDBe RCSB
PDB	List of PDB id codes 4DOH

Gene location (Human)
Chr.	Chromosome 3 (human)
Band	3q22.3	Start	136,946,230 bp
Band	3q22.3	End	137,011,085 bp

Gene location (Mouse)
Chr.	Chromosome 9 (mouse)
Band	9|9 E3.3	Start	100,339,772 bp
Band	9|9 E3.3	End	100,368,841 bp
RNA expression pattern
Bgee	Human / Mouse (ortholog); Top expressed in: skin of arm; skin of abdomen; skin of thigh; human penis; skin of hip; gingival epithelium; vulva; mucosa of pharynx; nipple; oral cavity / Top expressed in: lip; skin of external ear; esophagus; cerebellar cortex; skin of back; skin of abdomen; morula; lobe of cerebellum; cerebellar vermis; embryo; More reference expression data
BioGPS	n/a
Gene ontology
Molecular function	interleukin-20 binding; interleukin-10 receptor activity; protein binding; cytokine receptor activity
Cellular component	integral component of membrane; membrane; plasma membrane
Biological process	homeostasis of number of cells within a tissue; immune response-inhibiting signal transduction; negative regulation of T cell proliferation; negative regulation of interferon-gamma production; negative regulation of interleukin-2 production; negative regulation of type IV hypersensitivity; positive regulation of interleukin-4 production; inflammatory response to antigenic stimulus; regulation of T cell activation; positive regulation of interleukin-10 production; cytokine-mediated signaling pathway
Sources:Amigo / QuickGO
Orthologs
Databases	NCBI: entry; OMA: entry
Species	Human	Mouse
Entrez	53833	213208
Ensembl	ENSG00000174564	ENSMUSG00000044244
UniProt	Q6UXL0	E9Q9A6
RefSeq (mRNA)	NM_144717	NM_001033543; NM_001037246
RefSeq (protein)	NP_653318	NP_001028715
Location (UCSC)	Chr 3: 136.95 – 137.01 Mb	Chr 9: 100.34 – 100.37 Mb
PubMed search
- Wikidata
View/Edit Human	View/Edit Mouse

Interleukin 20 receptor, beta subunit (IL20R2 or IL20RB) is a subunit of the interleukin-20 receptor and interleukin-22 receptor. It is believed to be involved in both pro-inflammatory and anti-inflammatory responses.

IL20RB is found in many organ resident effector cells such as keratinocytes at the skin epidermis, osteoclasts, found in bones, and epithelial cells of the intestine and trachea. IL20RB is also found in some immune cells. The subunit has been linked with multiple diseases, including gastrointestinal diseases and glaucoma.

== Structure and function ==
IL20RB is a β-chain with a short intracellular domain. IL20RB, along with the IL-20 receptor, alpha subunit, form the heterodimeric type I interleukin-20 receptor, which binds the cytokines IL-19, IL-20 and IL-24. IL20RB also associates with IL-22 receptor, to form the heterodimeric type II interleukin-20 receptor, which also binds IL-20 and IL-24.

== Signaling ==
After a cytokine binds both the IL20RB and the alpha subunit of the IL20 receptor, a signal is sent through the JAK-STAT signaling pathway. This signaling pathway leads STAT to act as a transcription factor, which can gene expression.

== Link to Immune System and Disease ==
IL20RB mRNA is present in some immune cells, including monocytes, natural killer cells, B-cells, T-cells, and some hematopoietic stem cells. It is known what role IL20RB plays in these cells.

IL20RB is linked with atherosclerosis and gastrointestinal diseases, although its specific roles are unknown.

== Glaucoma ==
IL20RB mRNA is expressed in retinal ganglion cells and optic nerves in rats. Mutations in the IL20RB gene are associated with glaucoma. The specific links between IL20RB and glaucoma are unknown, but IL20RB does not have a causative effect on the disease, instead contributing to an increased risk of the disease along with other factors, such as intraocular pressure.
