= IL-19 =

IL-19 or IL 19 can refer to:

- Interleukin 19
- Illinois's 19th congressional district
- Illinois Route 19
