= Immune system contribution to regeneration =

Immune system contribution to regeneration of tissues generally involves specific cellular components, transcription of a wide variety of genes, morphogenesis, epithelia renewal and proliferation of damaged cell types (progenitor or tissue-resident stem cells). However, current knowledge reveals more and more studies about immune system influence that cannot be omitted. As the immune system exhibits inhibitory or inflammatory functions during regeneration, the therapies are focused on either stopping these processes or control the immune cells setting in a regenerative way, suggesting that interplay between damaged tissue and immune system response must be well-balanced. Recent studies provide evidence that immune components are required not only after body injury but also in homeostasis or senescent cells replacement.

== Macrophages ==
Macrophages are an important regenerative components of the immune system and their dysfunction can impair tissue repair. Historically, macrophages have been grouped into one of two polarized states: M1 and M2. While this dichotomy overly simplifies the spectrum of macrophage activation states, M1 and M2 are still terms used to refer to mostly pro-inflammatory vs mostly anti-inflammatory macrophages. M1 macrophages are known as pro-inflammatory, (secreting cytokines IL-1, IL-6, TNF- α, and IFN-γ) playing a crucial role in pathogen phagocytosis and cell debris clearance and molecules that promote inflammation in comparison with M2 macrophages (anti-inflammatory macrophages secreting IL-10 and VEGF) that inhibit inflammation and initiate regenerative processes in the site of injury. Both must be polarized correctly and at the right time during the healing processes.

== T-regulatory cells ==
Skeletal muscle regeneration in the site of injury accumulates T-reg cells as a response to IL-33. T-reg cells directly induce M1/M2 phenotype of macrophages so they change the outcome and manage the processes in time. Another important function od T-regs is their activation of muscle cells precursors and proliferation of these cells by growth factors for example amphiregulin.

== Scavenger cells ==
Immune components are necessary in cellular debris clearance in order to avoid toxic products of dead or necrotic cells and to create space for the renewal of tissue and its incorporation into the organ. The main cells that are involved in this particular process are M1 macrophages also called scavengers. Phagocytosis of dead tissue can consequently activate the signaling cascade necessary for regeneration. For instance, the macrophages phagocytosis in liver of dead or necrotic hepatocytes induces Wnt expression, which can influence the proliferation and differentiation of hepatic progenitor cells into liver cells.

== Stem and progenitor cells regulation ==
Immune cells under the control of inflammatory cytokines and setting secrete molecules that can promote proliferation and differentiation of progenitors and stem cells and in certain organism also dedifferentiation of the tissue. ¨

For example, zebrafish regeneration of the nerve tissue is followed by brain injury and inflammation that activate microglia and leukocytes. The secretion of Leukotriene C4 consequently activates the radial glial cells (neural progenitors) and induce regeneration.

To add to this, neutrophils and macrophages in rats secrete growth factor oncomodulin that support axonal regeneration in the CNS. Microglia and macrophages together help in the oligodendrocyte remyelination.

Intestinal injury of the epithelia activates macrophages that secrete a wide range of survival and growth progenitor factors which is very similar to muscle regeneration. M1 macrophages induce proliferative environment by secreting cytokines IL6, TNF, IL1, and G-CSF.

== Dedifferentiation ==
Dedifferentiation is a pathway in which already differentiated tissue come back reversely in the process of differentiation. Cells loose differentiated setting and are becoming progenitor or stem cells again. Afterwards they can differentiate again into other cell types (usually like the tissue of origin). Thus, dedifferentiation displays the ability of regeneration in the absence or scarcity of stem or progenitor cells.

Recent studies discovered macrophages as an initial factor that contribute to the dedifferentiation of the cells in the site of injury and promote the formation of the progenitor cell pool during limb regeneration in the salamander. Molecules such as Oncostatin M are considered as a mediator of cardiomyocyte dedifferentiation and morphogenesis factor during myocardial infarction and chronic cardiomyopathy.

== Angiogenesis ==
Angiogenesis and branching of the veins are dependent on eosinophils, mast cells and myeloid cells during development. During the regeneration, blood flow is necessary to support tissue repair and remodeling. Key ligands expressed by macrophages Wnt5a and Wnt11 enhance the expression of the VEGF inhibitory receptor Flt1 so that blocking this pathway supports vascularization.

Other study focuses on heart injury. They found that during the late phase of scar formation M2 macrophages are needed for vascularization together with fibrosis to form a scar. Monocyte depletion impaired heart regeneration due to insufficient neoangiogenesis in mice. Even though there are different types of macrophages involved in wide range of processes that are still uncertain, the study suggests that macrophages promoting human heart regeneration might promote angiogenesis without fibroblasts activation.
