= IL-24 =

IL-24 or IL 24 can refer to:

- Interleukin 24
- Illinois's 24th congressional district, an obsolete district
- Illinois Route 24
- Ilyushin-24 Soviet bomber project. The design of the plane based on IL-22 was started after World War II and abandoned along with the IL-22 project.
