= IL-14 =

IL-14 or IL 14 can refer to:

- Interleukin 14
- Illinois's 14th congressional district
- Illinois Route 14
- Ilyushin Il-14 - Soviet aircraft
