= Th22 cell =

Th22 cells (T helper cells type 22) are subpopulation of CD4+ T cells that produce interleukin-22 (IL-22). They play a role in the protective mechanisms against variety of bacterial pathogens, tissue repair and wound healing, and also in pathologic processes, including inflammations, autoimmunity, tumors, and digestive organs damages.

== Characterization ==
Th22 cells are mainly defined by their high secretion of interleukin-22 (IL-22). Besides IL-22, Th22 cells also produce other cytokines, such as interleukin-13 (IL-13) and tumor necrosis factor alpha (TNF-alpha), but in very small quantities. Additionally, they could be characterized by their cell surface expression of CD3, CD4, CD28, number of chemokine receptors CCR10, CCR6, CCR4 that are associated with cutaneous T cell homing, and platelet-derived growth factor receptor (PGDFR).

== Differentiation ==
Th22 cells differentiate from naive T-lymphocytes in presence of number of cytokines and transcription factors.

=== Cytokines in differentiation ===
Activated naive CD4+ T cells differentiate into Th22 cells under the influence of interleukin-6 (IL-6) and tumor necrosis factor alpha (TNF-alpha). This process can be inhibited by the addition of increasing concentrations of transforming growth factor beta (TGF-beta). The combination of interleukin-21 (IL-21) and interleukin-23 (IL-23) can also induce the differentiation of naive T cells into Th22 cells via the endogenous toll-like receptor 4 ligand (TLR4), stimulating keratinocytes to secrete interleukin-23 (IL-23) and binds to the IL-23 receptor of skin dendritic cells. This mechanism induces the differentiation into Th22 cells and secretion of interleukin-22 (IL−22).

=== Transcription factors in differentiation ===
Downstream signaling of the transcription factor aryl hydrocarbon receptor (AHR) is essential for Th22 production of interleukin-22 (IL-22). RORγt acts as a positive transcription factor and T-bet acts as a negative transcription factor for Th22 cell differentiation. However, additional intracellular molecules involved in Th22 differentiation are still being investigated.

== Physiological functions ==
Through their production of interleukin-22 (IL-22), Th22 cells have been shown to be protective against a number of bacterial and viral pathogens. Interleukin-22 (IL-22) regulates different innate immune mechanisms to eliminate infiltration of invasive pathogens into the skin, gut and respiratory tract. Interleukin-22 (IL-22) influences keratinocytes and epithelial cells to stimulate proliferation and differentiation, thus promoting wound healing and cohesion of barrier integrity. Interleukin-22 (IL-22) also enhances stromal secretion of antimicrobial peptides, as well as production of the chemokines which promote recruitment of other immune cells.

== Th22 in diseases ==
Th22 has both pathologic and protective claimed roles when maintaining immunologic homeostasis. However, the role of Th22 in pathological processes has not been completely identified.

=== AIDS ===
It seems that Th22 cells could play a protective role in patients with AIDS. CCR5 and α4β7 molecules expressed by Th22 cells were able to bind to the circulating HIV receptor, and thus via interleukin-22 (IL-22) production protect against intestinal epithelial damage, leading to a mechanism of resistance against HIV-induced destruction of epithelial cell integrity.

=== Psoriasis ===
In psoriasis Th22 cells have been causally linked to pathological processes. In patients with psoriasis the levels of Th22 cells and interleukin-22 (IL-22) were increased. High levels of interleukin-22 (IL-22) together with interleukin-6 (IL-6) can induce the expression of antimicrobial proteins (AMPs), and stimulate the keratinocytes to secrete proinflammatory mediators and chemokines in the skin. In addition, it can also inhibit keratinocyte differentiation and inhibit the normal skin healing process.

=== Systemic lupus erythematosus ===
The role of Th22 cells in systematic lupus erythematous (SLE) is still unclear. In some patients levels of Th22 cells and interleukin-22 (IL-22) were increased, which correlated with disease activity, but decreased levels of interleukin-22 (IL-22) and Th22 cells were also reported. Interleukin-22 (IL-22) is a cytokine involved in recruiting neutrophils in response to microbe invading, and in the case of lupus, it seems that interleukin 22 (IL-22) is involved in inflammatory and pathological processes via recruiting of immune cells. On the other hand, Th22 cells might be a better predictor of systematic lupus erythematous (SLE) development than Th17 cells.

=== Tumors ===
Th22 cells are involved in tumorigenesis in cases of hepatocellular carcinoma, liposarcoma or colon cancer, and affect tumor tissue in two different pathways. Overexpression of interleukin-22 (IL-22) or Th22 cells may result in the progression of cancer growth and cause malignant epithelial cell proliferation. However, physiological functions of Th22 cells are tissue repair and wound healing. Some studies have shown a possible anti-tumor effect of these cells, and normal interleukin-22 (IL-22) secretion leads to tissue repair.
