= Interleukin 20 =

Protein found in humans

IL20

Identifiers
- Aliases: IL20, IL-20, IL10D, ZCYTO10, Interleukin 20
- External IDs: OMIM: 605619; MGI: 1890473; GeneCards: IL20
Available structures
| PDB | Ortholog search: PDBe RCSB |
| PDB | List of PDB id codes 4DOH |

Gene location (Human)
| Chr. | Chromosome 1 (human) |
| Band | 1q32.1 | Start | 206,865,354 bp |
| Band | 1q32.1 | End | 206,869,223 bp |

Gene location (Mouse)
| Chr. | Chromosome 1 (mouse) |
| Band | 1|1 E4 | Start | 130,834,722 bp |
| Band | 1|1 E4 | End | 130,839,188 bp |
RNA expression pattern
| Bgee | Human / Mouse (ortholog); Top expressed in: gonad; pancreatic ductal cell; seminal vesicula; smooth muscle tissue; stromal cell of endometrium; olfactory zone of nasal mucosa; left uterine tube; skin of abdomen; myometrium; skin of limb / Top expressed in: zygote; secondary oocyte; primary oocyte; right ventricle; artery; mammillary body; ventral tegmental area; skin of abdomen; carotid body; major salivary gland; More reference expression data |
| BioGPS | n/a |
Gene ontology
| Molecular function | interleukin-20 receptor binding; signaling receptor binding; cytokine activity; interleukin-22 receptor binding; protein binding |
| Cellular component | extracellular region; extracellular space |
| Biological process | positive regulation of keratinocyte differentiation; positive regulation of osteoclast differentiation; positive regulation of epidermal cell differentiation; regulation of inflammatory response; positive regulation of tyrosine phosphorylation of STAT protein; regulation of signaling receptor activity; cytokine-mediated signaling pathway |
Sources:Amigo / QuickGO
Orthologs
| Databases | NCBI: entry; OMA: entry |
| Species | Human | Mouse |
| Entrez | 50604 | 58181 |
| Ensembl | ENSG00000162891 | ENSMUSG00000026416 |
| UniProt | Q9NYY1 | Q9JKV9 |
| RefSeq (mRNA) | NM_018724 | NM_021380; NM_001311091 |
| RefSeq (protein) | NP_061194 | NP_001298020; NP_067355 |
| Location (UCSC) | Chr 1: 206.87 – 206.87 Mb | Chr 1: 130.83 – 130.84 Mb |
| PubMed search |
- Wikidata
| View/Edit Human | View/Edit Mouse |

Interleukin 20 (IL20) is a protein that is in humans encoded by the IL20 gene which is located in close proximity to the IL-10 gene on the 1q32 chromosome. IL-20 is a part of an IL-20 subfamily which is a part of a larger IL-10 family.

IL-20 subfamily also includes other cytokines, including IL-19, IL-20, IL-22, IL-24, and IL-26. Members of the cytokine IL-20 subfamily form an important link between the immune system and epithelial tissues because receptors for these cytokines are highly expressed on epithelial cells and are almost exclusively produced by cells of the immune system.

IL-20 requires an IL-β-subunit receptor (IL-20RB) for signaling, which can form a functional heterodimeric receptor with either the α-subunit of the IL-20 receptor (IL-20RA) or the α1-subunit of the IL-22 receptor (IL-22RA1). Both of these receptor variants allow efficient IL-20 signaling. Receptors for IL-20 are expressed in the skin, lungs, ovary, testes, and placenta. IL-20 is mainly produced by myeloid cells such as monocytes, granulocytes, and dendritic cells but can also be produced by keratinocytes and fibroblasts. The expression of IL-20 is stimulated by IL-1β, IL-17, IL-22, TNF, and LPS. The main cellular targets of IL-20 are keratinocytes, endothelial cells, and adipocytes. IL-20 has been shown to transduce its signal through signal transducer and activator of transcription 3 (STAT3) in keratinocytes.

== Function ==
IL-20 has a broad range of functions and is involved in a variety of immune and non-immune processes in the body. For example, IL-20 is involved in the process of wound healing, proliferation of epithelial cells, prevention of apoptosis of epithelial cells, regulation of differentiation of keratinocytes during inflammation, the expansion of multipotential hematopoietic progenitor cells, and more.

A specific receptor for this cytokine is highly upregulated in psoriatic skin. Dysfunctional regulation of IL-20 could lead to uncontrollable wound healing in psoriasis, which could be a contributing factor to the pathogenesis of this disease.

Because IL-20 is involved in the promotion of proliferation of epithelial cells it is also linked to the development of cancer. Receptors for IL-20 are very often expressed on tumorous cells of epithelial origin. High expression of IL-20 is also associated with bladder cancer. On the other hand, IL-20 is known to prevent tissue damage as a result of chronic inflammation which may reduce the chance of developing cancer. So the role of IL-20 in cancer development is ambiguous and needs to be further explored.

IL-20 is an angiogenesis factor and is highly expressed in artery plaques found in patients with atherosclerosis.

== In rheumatoid arthritis ==
IL-20 is involved in many stages of rheumatoid arthritis (RA) progression. IL-20 stimulates the secretion of chemokines MCP-1 and IL-8 in synovial fibroblasts, which attract neutrophils and T-cells. IL-20 is also an upstream regulator of TNF-α, IL-1, and IL-6, which are involved in the pathogenesis of RA. IL-20 is highly expressed in the synovial fluid of RA patients. Serum levels of IL-20 are not different from those of healthy controls, suggesting that IL-20 is involved in the pathogenesis of RA only at local sites of inflammation. Receptors for IL-20 are highly expressed in the synovial membranes of RA patients. Due to the clear association of IL-20 with RA, anti-IL-20 antibody is now in a clinical trial for RA.

== Antibody ==
Anti-IL-20 monoclonal antibodies have been researched as clinical candidates for the treatment or prevention of psoriasis, rheumatoid arthritis, atherosclerosis, osteoporosis, and stroke. The anti-IL-20 antibody has been shown to reduce the severity of RA in rats, mitigate bone destruction, and more. The anti-IL-20 antibody neutralizes not only IL-20 signaling but also decreases TNF-α, IL-1, and IL-6 signaling in vivo. A human recombinant monoclonal antibody against IL-20 developed by Novo now entered the IIb phase of a clinical trial.
