= Alpha-taxilin =

Protein found in humans

TXLNA

Identifiers
- Aliases: TXLNA, IL14, TXLN, IL-14, taxilin alpha
- External IDs: OMIM: 608676; MGI: 105968; GeneCards: TXLNA

Gene location (Human)
| Chr. | Chromosome 1 (human) |
| Band | 1p35.2 | Start | 32,179,675 bp |
| Band | 1p35.2 | End | 32,198,285 bp |

Gene location (Mouse)
| Chr. | Chromosome 4 (mouse) |
| Band | 4 D2.2|4 63.26 cM | Start | 129,519,871 bp |
| Band | 4 D2.2|4 63.26 cM | End | 129,534,858 bp |
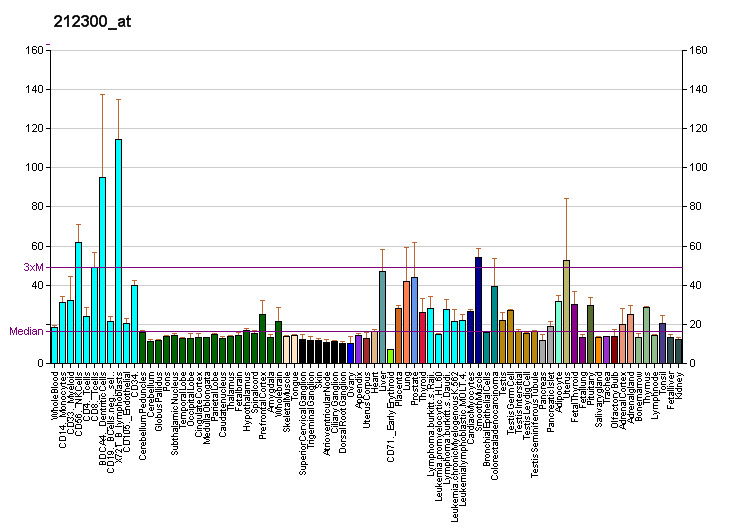
RNA expression pattern
| Bgee | Human / Mouse (ortholog); Top expressed in: stromal cell of endometrium; tendon of biceps brachii; right adrenal gland; left adrenal gland; right adrenal cortex; body of uterus; left adrenal cortex; right coronary artery; left uterine tube; anterior pituitary / Top expressed in: hand; ventricular zone; mandibular prominence; lip; maxillary prominence; foot; genital tubercle; tail of embryo; epiblast; otolith organ; More reference expression data |
| BioGPS | More reference expression data |
Gene ontology
| Molecular function | cytokine activity; syntaxin binding; protein binding; high molecular weight B cell growth factor receptor binding |
| Cellular component | cytoplasm; membrane; extracellular region; cytosol |
| Biological process | B cell activation; cell population proliferation; exocytosis; regulation of signaling receptor activity; cytokine-mediated signaling pathway |
Sources:Amigo / QuickGO
Orthologs
| Databases | NCBI: entry; OMA: entry |
| Species | Human | Mouse |
| Entrez | 200081 | 109658 |
| Ensembl | ENSG00000084652 | ENSMUSG00000053841 |
| UniProt | P40222 | Q6PAM1 |
| RefSeq (mRNA) | NM_175852; NM_001376857; NM_001376858; NM_001376859 | NM_001005506; NM_001199695 |
| RefSeq (protein) | NP_787048; NP_001363786; NP_001363787; NP_001363788 | NP_001005506; NP_001186624 |
| Location (UCSC) | Chr 1: 32.18 – 32.2 Mb | Chr 4: 129.52 – 129.53 Mb |
| PubMed search |
- Wikidata
| View/Edit Human | View/Edit Mouse |

Alpha-taxilin also known as interleukin-14 (IL-14) or high molecular weight B-cell growth factor (HMW-BCGF) is a protein that in humans is encoded by the TXLNA gene.

Interleukin-14 is a cytokine that controls the growth and proliferation of both normal and cancerous B cells. This molecule was also recently designated taxilin. IL-14 induces B-cell proliferation, inhibits antibody secretion, and expands selected B-cell subgroups. This interleukin is produced mainly by T cells and certain malignant B cells.

== Gene ==
In murine models, two distinct transcripts are produced from opposite strands of the il14 gene that are called IL-14α and IL-14β. The il14 locus is near the gene for LCK on chromosome 1 in humans.
