= Thymus stromal cells =

Thymus stromal cells are subsets of specialized cells located in different areas of the thymus. They include all non-T-lineage cells, such as thymic epithelial cells (TECs), endothelial cells, mesenchymal cells, dendritic cells, and B lymphocytes, and provide signals essential for thymocyte development and the homeostasis of the thymic stroma.

== Structure ==
The thymus is a primary lymphoid organ of the immune system. It is a butterfly-shaped organ consisting of two lobes, located in the top part of the chest, that supports T cell development via specialized microenvironments that ensure a diverse, functional, and self-tolerant T cell population. These microenvironments are classically defined as distinct cortex and medulla regions that each contain specialized subsets of stromal cells. The stepwise progression of thymocyte development requires their migration through these thymic regions, where interactions with cTEC and mTEC subsets take place.

== Function ==
Thymus stromal cells provide chemokines and cytokines during the early stages of T lymphocyte development, and they are essential for promoting the homing thymic-seeding progenitors, inducing T-lineage differentiation, and supporting thymocyte survival and proliferation. The predominant stromal cells found in the postnatal thymus are thymic epithelial cells (TECs).

cTECs – (cortical thymic epithelial cells) are located in the cortex, and they are responsible for T lineage commitment and positive selection of early thymocytes, cTECs provide cytokines, such as interleukin 7 (IL-7) and SCF complex, to promote early thymocyte progenitor (ETP) proliferation as well as DLL4-mediated Notch signaling to induce the differentiation of ETP toward the T lineage.

mTECs (medullary thymic epithelial cells) in the medulla contribute to the development of T cell tolerance by purging autoreactive T lymphocytes by expression of cell-type-specific genes referred to as tissue-restricted antigens (TRA), and they also participate in the final stages of thymocyte maturation. mTECs also predominantly express receptor RANK, a major mediator of the thymic crosstalk signal, that is involved in the formation of the thymic medulla.

Mesenchymal stromal cells are required to create the thymic microenvironment and to maintain epithelial architecture and function in the thymus during organogenesis. They also serve as the major source of retinoic acid, which promotes the proliferation of cTECs. In the adult thymus, mesenchymal cells are found as fibroblastic cells that express a set of structural proteins and functional molecules, such as collagens, CD34, fibroblast-specific protein-1 (FSP1), platelet-derived growth factor receptor α (PDGFRα). They are crucial for the maintenance and regeneration of mTECs.

== Clinical significance ==
=== Inborn defects of thymus stromal cells ===
Inborn errors of thymic stromal cell development and function lead to impaired T cell development resulting in a susceptibility to opportunistic infections and autoimmunity. The most serious clinical expression of a thymic stromal cell defect is profound T cell lymphopaenia, presenting as a complete DiGeorge syndrome or severe combined immune deficiency (T^{−}B^{+}NK^{+} SCID).

=== Role in thymus atrophy and aging ===
There is large evidence indicating the main target of age-linked thymic dysfunction is thymic stroma with a microenvironment consisting of thymic stromal cells. Studies showed that in the thymic stromal cells, especially cTECs, there is (in the case of an aging thymus) deficiency in the peroxide-quenching enzyme catalase. This deficiency renders thymic stromal cells sensitive to damage induced by inflammation and damage-associated molecular patterns (DAMPs), such as reactive oxygen species (ROS), and then accumulated metabolic damage and oxidative stress promote thymic dysfunction due to age and accelerated thymus atrophy.
