= IL22RA1 =

Protein-coding gene in humans

Identifiers
- Aliases: IL22RA1, CRF2-9, IL22R, IL22R1, interleukin 22 receptor subunit alpha 1
- External IDs: OMIM: 605457; MGI: 2663588; GeneCards: IL22RA1
Available structures
PDB	Ortholog search: PDBe RCSB
PDB	List of PDB id codes 3DGC, 3DLQ

Gene location (Human)
Chr.	Chromosome 1 (human)
Band	1p36.11	Start	24,119,771 bp
Band	1p36.11	End	24,143,140 bp

Gene location (Mouse)
Chr.	Chromosome 4 (mouse)
Band	4 D3|4 67.99 cM	Start	135,455,483 bp
Band	4 D3|4 67.99 cM	End	135,479,451 bp
RNA expression pattern
Bgee	Human / Mouse (ortholog); Top expressed in: body of pancreas; jejunal mucosa; skin of leg; skin of abdomen; skin of arm; pancreatic ductal cell; mucosa of ileum; duodenum; mucosa of colon; gingival epithelium / Top expressed in: jejunum; ileum; colon; duodenum; lip; zone of skin; yolk sac; esophagus; liver; human kidney; More reference expression data
BioGPS	n/a
Gene ontology
Molecular function	interferon receptor activity; protein binding; interleukin-20 binding; cytokine receptor activity
Cellular component	integral component of membrane; membrane; plasma membrane
Biological process	defense response to Gram-negative bacterium; biological process; cytokine-mediated signaling pathway
Sources:Amigo / QuickGO
Orthologs
Databases	NCBI: entry; OMA: entry
Species	Human	Mouse
Entrez	58985	230828
Ensembl	ENSG00000142677	ENSMUSG00000037157
UniProt	Q8N6P7	Q80XZ4
RefSeq (mRNA)	NM_021258	NM_178257
RefSeq (protein)	NP_067081	NP_839988
Location (UCSC)	Chr 1: 24.12 – 24.14 Mb	Chr 4: 135.46 – 135.48 Mb
PubMed search
- Wikidata
View/Edit Human	View/Edit Mouse

Interleukin 22 receptor, alpha 1 is a protein that in humans is encoded by the IL22RA1 gene.

== Function ==
The protein encoded by this gene belongs to the class II cytokine receptor family, and has been shown to be a receptor for interleukin 22 (IL22). IL22 receptor is a protein complex that consists of this protein and interleukin 10 receptor, beta (IL10RB/CRFB4), a subunit also shared by the receptor complex for interleukin 10 (IL10). This gene and interleukin 28 receptor, alpha (IL28RA) form a cytokine receptor gene cluster in the chromosomal region 1p36.
