= Interleukin 19 =

Protein found in humans

IL19
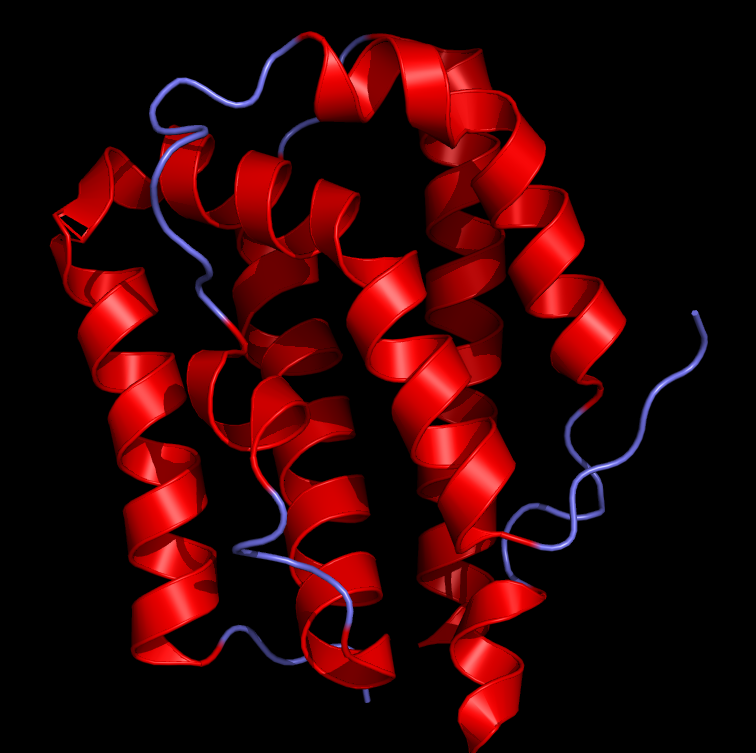

Identifiers
- Aliases: IL19, IL-10C, MDA1, NG.1, ZMDA1, Interleukin 19, IL-19
- External IDs: OMIM: 605687; MGI: 1890472; GeneCards: IL19
Available structures
PDB	Ortholog search: PDBe RCSB
PDB	List of PDB id codes 1N1F

Gene location (Human)
Chr.	Chromosome 1 (human)
Band	1q32.1	Start	206,770,764 bp
Band	1q32.1	End	206,842,981 bp

Gene location (Mouse)
Chr.	Chromosome 1 (mouse)
Band	1|1 E4	Start	130,860,393 bp
Band	1|1 E4	End	130,867,852 bp
RNA expression pattern
Bgee	Human / Mouse (ortholog); Top expressed in: nasal epithelium; gastric mucosa; stromal cell of endometrium; olfactory zone of nasal mucosa; periodontal fiber; minor salivary glands; palpebral conjunctiva; granulocyte; trachea; lymph node / Top expressed in: embryo; yolk sac; secondary oocyte; placenta; pancreas; More reference expression data
BioGPS	n/a
Gene ontology
Molecular function	cytokine activity; protein binding
Cellular component	extracellular region; extracellular space
Biological process	negative regulation of extrinsic apoptotic signaling pathway; positive regulation of apoptotic signaling pathway; positive regulation of intrinsic apoptotic signaling pathway; signal transduction; reactive oxygen species metabolic process; apoptotic process; immune response; regulation of signaling receptor activity; cytokine-mediated signaling pathway; negative regulation of low-density lipoprotein particle clearance
Sources:Amigo / QuickGO
Orthologs
Databases	NCBI: entry; OMA: entry
Species	Human	Mouse
Entrez	29949	329244
Ensembl	ENSG00000142224	ENSMUSG00000016524
UniProt	Q9UHD0	Q8CJ70
RefSeq (mRNA)	NM_013371; NM_153758; NM_001369605; NM_001393490; NM_001393491	NM_001009940; NM_001355135
RefSeq (protein)	NP_037503; NP_715639; NP_001356534	NP_001009940; NP_001342064
Location (UCSC)	Chr 1: 206.77 – 206.84 Mb	Chr 1: 130.86 – 130.87 Mb
PubMed search
- Wikidata
View/Edit Human	View/Edit Mouse

Interleukin 19 (IL-19) is an immunosuppressive protein that belongs to the IL-10 cytokine subfamily.

Human IL-19 is encoded by the IL19 gene which codes for 9 exons and is located on chromosome 1. The IL-19 protein is composed of 159 amino acids and has a quaternary structure with alpha helix motifs and loops. IL-19 is preferentially expressed in monocytes, macrophages, and T and B lymphocytes, but interacts with immune cells (macrophages, T cells, B cells) and non-immune cells (endothelial cells and brain resident glial cells, etc).

IL-19 initiates JAK-STAT signaling which activates genes and creates mRNA sequences (transcription) that are translated into proteins (translation) which have downstream effector functions. IL-19 signaling uses IL-20 dimer receptor complexes that bind the IL-19 ligand, Janus kinases (JAKs), and the signal transducer and activator of transcription 3 (STAT3) to initiate the molecular signaling cascade shown on the diagram on the right.

== Function ==
IL-19 is associated with broad functions across inflammation, cell development, viral responses, and lipid metabolism. As an immunosuppressive cytokine, IL-19 promotes the Th2 (regulatory) T-cell response which supports an anti-inflammatory lymphocyte phenotype, dampens the Th1 T-cell response and inflammatory cytokine secretion (IFNγ), increases IL-10 (anti-inflammatory) expression in peripheral blood mononuclear cells (PBMC), and inhibits the production of immunoglobulin G (IgG) from B cells.

=== Cell adhesion molecule regulation ===
IL-19 suppresses the expression of RNA-binding protein HuR. This protein is responsible for stabilizing mRNA that codes for cell adhesion molecules (CAMs) which are secreted by activated macrophages and facilitate neutrophil extravasation into peripheral or cardiac tissue. The downregulation of this factor affects the translation adhesion molecules which are expressed in the endothelial cells lined up in blood vessels. A reduced number of neutrophils entering cardiac tissue serves as a protective mechanism that limits the vascular tissue damage that ensues from inflammatory processes.

=== Chronic inflammatory disease ===
IL-19 has been reported to enhance chronic inflammatory diseases. IL-19 is produced by and regulates cells of the monocyte lineage, such as alveolar macrophages and lung dendritic cells. Several studies have used IL-19-deficient (IL-19-/-) mice and tested them at baseline (naïve) and following immune challenge with microbial products or recombinant cytokines. Naïve IL-19-/- mice show a decreased percentage of monocyte-derived cells and express significantly less MHC class II in response to stimulation with exogenous antigens such as lipopolysaccharide (LPS). IL-19-/- mice also show dysregulated neurogenic-locus-notch-homolog-protein-2 (Notch2) expression which plays a role in cell differentiation. Since MHC class II mediates peptide presentation to T cells and Notch 2 determines cell fate decision, endogenous IL-19 appears to regulate both processes.

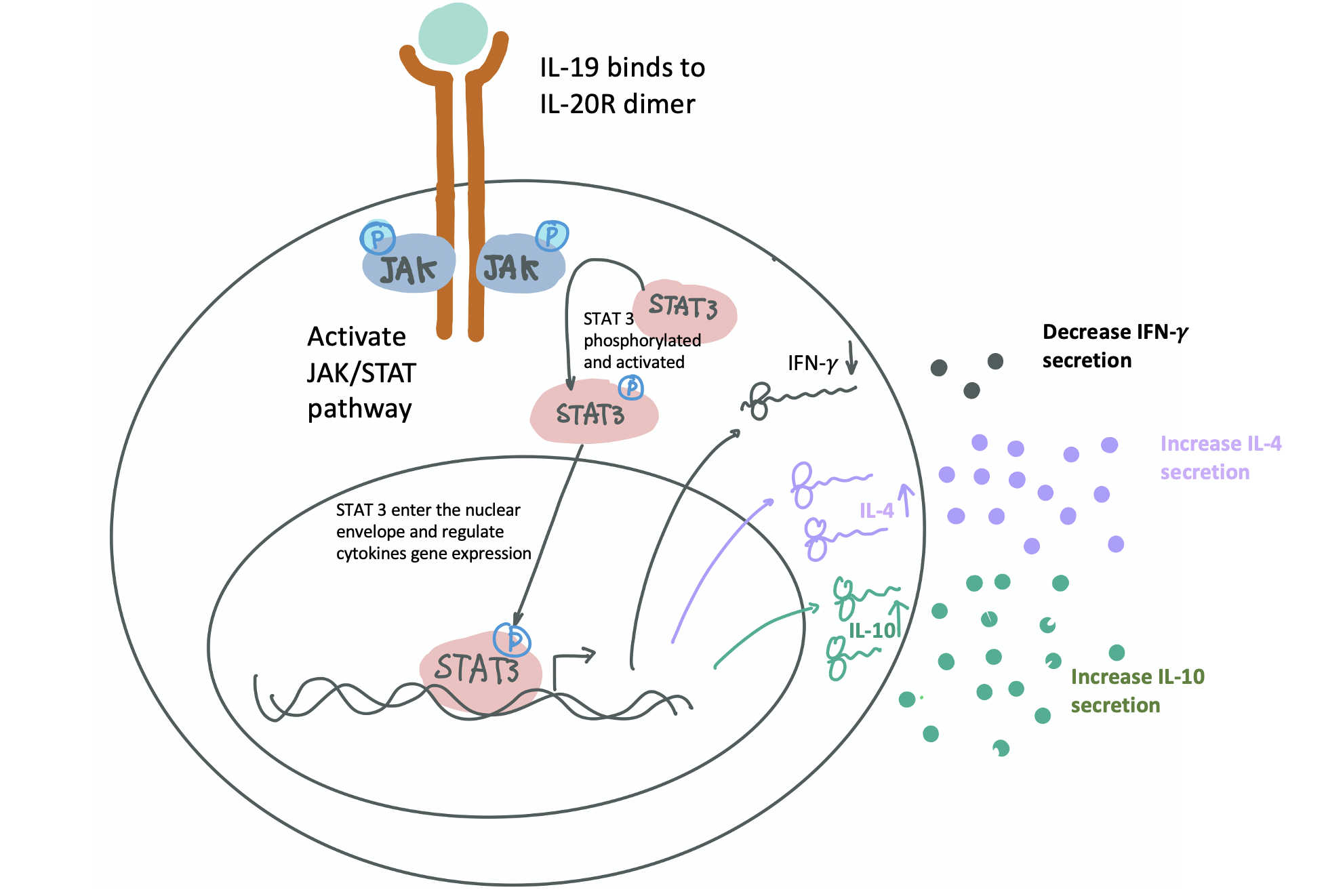
A demonstration of IL-19 binding to the IL20 Receptor on the surface of immune cells to regulate cytokine expression

=== Immune cell polarization ===
The induction of the anti-inflammatory cytokines IL-10 and IL-4 and the downregulation of pro-inflammatory cytokines such as IFN-γ shifts the phenotype of a T helper cell away from T-helper 1 (Th1) phenotype and towards the T-helper 2 (Th2) phenotype. This process of immune cell polarization occurs when immune cells adopt distinct programs and perform specialized functions in response to specific signals. During vascular infection (bacterial, fungal or viral infection develops within an artery or a vein), the Th1 phenotype predominates in the T cell population, and interferon-gamma (IFN-γ), tumor necrosis factor-alpha (TNF-α), and other pro-inflammatory cytokines are secreted at high levels. If cytokine secretion is left unrestricted, there may be potential consequences including vessel or tissue damage. In contrast, cells with the Th2 phenotype secrete IL-4 and IL-10 and downregulate IFN-γ which collectively dampen the inflammatory response. Analogously to lymphocytes, macrophages receiving the IL-19 signal are polarized from the pro-inflammatory phenotype (M1) to the anti-inflammatory phenotype (M2).

=== Neutrophil development ===
Osteocytes are the most abundant cells in the bone and they are responsible for bone health. Osteocytes are important regulators of hematopoiesis so they are important in aiding cellular development. Studies with mice have shown that the constitutive activation of mechanistic target of rapamycin complex (a protein complex that functions as a nutrient/energy /redox sensor and controls protein synthesis), or mTORC1 in osteocytes shows a dramatic increase in IL-19 production and expands neutrophil precursor numbers. IL-19 administration also stimulated neutrophil development but the depletion of endogenous IL-19 or its cognate receptor inhibited cell development, suggesting that IL-19 is an essential regulator of neutrophil development.

=== Lipid metabolism ===
Nonalcoholic steatohepatitis (NASH) is a disease that has progressed from nonalcoholic fatty liver disease (NAFLD) and is characterized by inflammation and fibrosis. Findings showed that the effects of a high fat diet on liver injury, inflammation, and fibrosis were significantly worse in IL-19 gene-deficient mice than controls. This is congruous with a significantly higher secretion of IL-6, TNF-α, and TGF-β secretion (pro-inflammatory cytokines) in IL-19 gene-deficient mice. IL-19 administration decreased triglyceride and cholesterol levels in HepG2 cells (isolated from a hepatocellular carcinoma patient) and the expression of fatty acid synthesis-related enzymes (reduced lipogenesis). IL-19 is therefore closely linked to the suppression of lipid metabolism.

=== Neuroprotection ===
The resident glial cells of the central nervous system participate in the initiation and regulation of neuroinflammation. Glial cells such as microglia and astrocytes secrete proinflammatory cytokines in response to foreign antigens and immunosuppressive cytokines to resolve inflammation at the recovery phase of the immune response. Within the brain, IL-19 is secreted by astrocytes in a delayed fashion. The IL-19 ligand interacts with cells expressing IL-20 receptors such as microglia and initiate a signaling cascade that regulates cytokine secretion. IL-19 signaling acts as secondary neuroprotective pathway that limits the inflammatory response and protect the brain from CNS insults.

=== Autoimmunity ===
IL-17A is implicated in the immune response and in the pathogenesis of inflammatory autoimmune diseases such as psoriasis. IL-17A upregulates IL-19, IL-20, and IL-24 and this was shown by enhanced IL-17A expression using anti-IL-10 neutralizing antibodies (block IL-10 inhibitory effects and facilitate cytokine secretion). Findings showed upregulated IL-23/IL-17 pathway related cytokines, IL-19, and IL-24, pronounced inflammation, and keratinocyte proliferation.

=== HIV ===
The most effective current treatment for HIV is combination antiretroviral therapy (cART) which stops the virus from making copies of itself using host cells and slows down the development of AIDS. Although cART therapy can help HIV-infected patients recover CD4+ T cells, there are several factors that affect T cell restoration and the maintenance of an undetectable viral load. One of these factors is single nucleotide polymorphisms (SNPs) in immune relevant cytokines (IL-15, IFNγ, IL-19).

While many individuals respond to cART, there are individuals who are immunological non-responders (INR) which means that the density of T helper cells they have is below the 200 cells/μL threshold after two years on successful cART. Correlational studies have shown that polymorphisms in the IFNγ and IL-19 genes significantly impact the probability of failing to achieve an optimal immune recovery in HIV-patients starting cART.

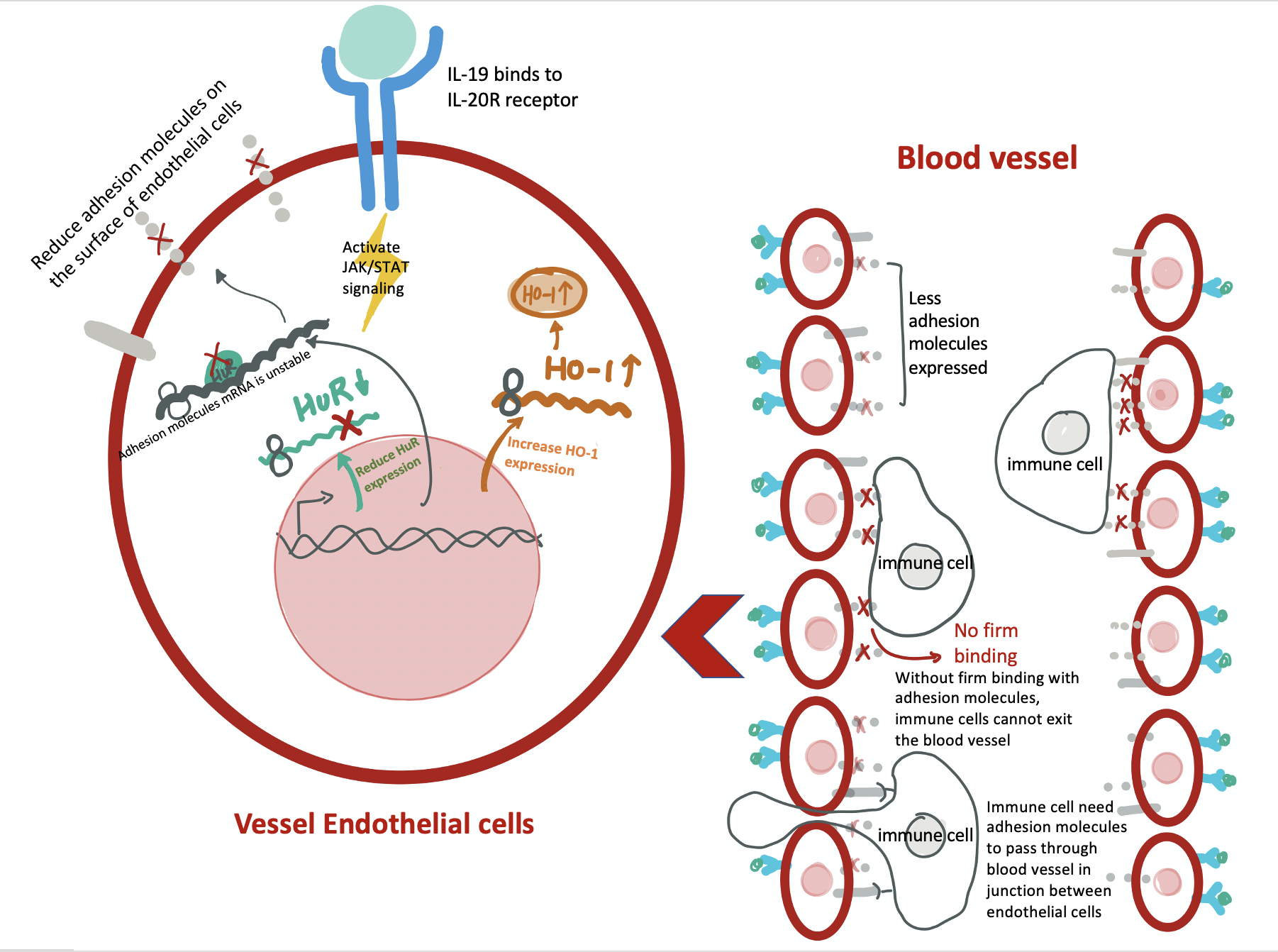
A demonstration of the protective effect of IL-19 in vascular disease by decreasing immune cell recruitment to inflamed tissue and reducing oxidative stress

=== Other relevant functions ===
IL-19 upregulates the expression of heme oxygenase-1 (HO-1) and reduces reactive oxygen species in human vascular smooth muscle cells.

== IL-10 family ==
Interleukin-19 is a cytokine that belongs to the IL-10 family of cytokines along with several other interleukins including IL-10, IL-20, IL-22, IL-24, IL-26, and several virus-encoded cytokines. It signals through the same cell surface receptor (IL-20R) that is used by IL-20 and IL-24.
