= Interleukin-22 receptor =

Transmembrane protein found in humans

interleukin 22 receptor, alpha 1

Identifiers
- Symbol: IL22RA1
- Alt. symbols: IL22R
- NCBI gene: 58985
- HGNC: 13700
- OMIM: 605457
- RefSeq: NM_021258
- UniProt: A8K839

Other data
- Locus: Chr. 1 p36.11
Search for
- Structures: Swiss-model
- Domains: InterPro

interleukin 22 receptor, alpha 2

Identifiers
- Symbol: IL22RA2
- NCBI gene: 116379
- HGNC: 14901
- OMIM: 606648
- RefSeq: NM_181310
- UniProt: Q969J5

Other data
- Locus: Chr. 6 q24.1-24.2
Search for
- Structures: Swiss-model
- Domains: InterPro

Interleukin-22 receptor is a type II cytokine receptor. It binds to Interleukin-22. It is a heterodimer of α1 and IL-10Rβ2 subunits.
