= Tucotuzumab celmoleukin =

Monoclonal antibody drug

Monoclonal antibody
- Type: Whole antibody
- Source: Humanized (from mouse)
- Target: EpCAM

Clinical data
- Other names: EMD 273066
- ATC code: none

Identifiers
- CAS Number: 339986-90-2
- ChemSpider: none
- UNII: 4ON7FF680U
- KEGG: D09027

Chemical and physical data
- Formula: C_{7812}H_{12124}N_{2044}O_{2408}S_{60}
- Molar mass: 175130.42 g·mol^{−1}

Tucotuzumab celmoleukin is an anti-cancer drug. It is a fusion protein of a humanized monoclonal antibody (tucotuzumab) and an interleukin-2 (celmoleukin).

This drug was developed by EMD Pharmaceuticals.
