= Interleukin 26 =

Protein-coding gene in the species Homo sapiens

IL26

Identifiers
- Aliases: IL26, AK155, IL-26, interleukin 26
- External IDs: OMIM: 605679; GeneCards: IL26

Gene location (Human)
Chr.	Chromosome 12 (human)
Band	12q15	Start	68,201,349 bp
Band	12q15	End	68,225,810 bp
RNA expression pattern
Bgee	Human / Mouse (ortholog); Top expressed in: appendix; amniotic fluid; mucosa of transverse colon; granulocyte; lymph node; tonsil; rectum; cartilage tissue; gallbladder; spleen / n/a; More reference expression data
BioGPS	n/a
Gene ontology
Molecular function	cytokine activity
Cellular component	cytosol; extracellular space; extracellular region
Biological process	cell-cell signaling; positive regulation of protein kinase B signaling; positive regulation of receptor signaling pathway via JAK-STAT; positive regulation of transcription by RNA polymerase II; positive regulation of stress-activated MAPK cascade; positive regulation of ERK1 and ERK2 cascade; negative regulation of epithelial cell proliferation; regulation of signaling receptor activity; cytokine-mediated signaling pathway
Sources:Amigo / QuickGO
Orthologs
Databases	NCBI: entry; OMA: entry
Species	Human	Mouse
Entrez	55801	n/a
Ensembl	ENSG00000111536	n/a
UniProt	Q9NPH9	n/a
RefSeq (mRNA)	NM_018402	n/a
RefSeq (protein)	NP_060872	n/a
Location (UCSC)	Chr 12: 68.2 – 68.23 Mb	n/a
PubMed search		n/a
- Wikidata
View/Edit Human

Interleukin-26 (IL-26) is a protein that in humans is encoded by the IL26 gene.

IL-26 is the most recently identified member of the IL-20 cytokine subfamily, which was formed according to the usage of common receptor subunits and similarities in target-cell profiles and functions. All cytokines belonging to this subfamily are members of the larger IL-10 family. IL-26 is expressed in certain herpesvirus-transformed T cells but not in primary stimulated T cells. IL-26 signals through a receptor complex comprising two distinct proteins called IL-20 receptor 1 and IL-10 receptor 2. By signaling through this receptor complex, IL-26 induces rapid phosphorylation of the transcription factors STAT1 and STAT3, which enhance IL-10 and IL-8 secretion and as expression of the CD54 molecule on the surface of epithelial cells.

== Gene organization and protein structure ==
The IL26 gene is conserved in various vertebrates, but it is curiously absent in mice and rats. Paralogs of this gene have been identified in several non-mammalian species. The human gene is located on chromosome 12 (12q15), between the genes encoding IL-22 and IFNγ, and composed of five exons separated by three introns. This genomic cluster of genes encoding IL-22, IL-26, and IFNγ is present among all vertebrates.

IL-26 is a 171-amino acid protein that exhibits six alpha helices connected by loops and four conserved cysteine residues. Endogenous IL-26 is expressed as a 36 kDa homodimer. Originally named AK155, IL-26 was categorized in the IL-10 cytokine family due to sequence homology and secondary structure similarities.

== Expression ==
The IL-26 expression was initially discovered in human HVS-transformed T cells. Since then it was confirmed that T helper 1 cells and Th17 memory CD4+ cells are the major sources of IL-26. More accurately, IL-26 is expressed by pro-inflammatory IL-17 producing T cells in chronically inflamed tissues. Co-expression of IL-17, IL-22, and IL-26 de facto defines the phenotype of human Th17 cells. Furthermore, CD26+ CD4+ T cells produce IL-26 in a model of graft-versus-host disease (GvHD). CD4+ T cells polarized toward a regulatory phenotype (Treg), naïve CD4+ T cells, and T helper 2 cells show low or no expression of IL-26.

It remains unclear whether IL-26 monocytes and macrophages express IL-26. Some studies showed there is no expression, whereas other studies inconsistently reported constitutive expression at a low level in monocytes, and the secretion of IL-26 by lung alveolar macrophages locally exposed to endotoxin. The IL-26 expression is also present in NK cells, especially NKp44+ human NK cell subset localized in mucosa-associated lymphoid tissue express substantial amounts of IL-26. Very low IL-26 expression was reported in human herpesvirus 8-transformed B cells.

Regarding non-immune cells, IL-26 expression was detected in primary bronchial epithelial cells from healthy individuals. Pathologically, fibroblasts harvested from the inflamed synovia of patients with rheumatoid arthritis constituted the main source of IL-26.

== Receptors ==
IL-26R heterodimer, a conventional receptor for IL-26, consists of two chains – IL-10R2, and IL-20R1. The IL-20R1 subunit contains the IL-26-binding site, whereas the IL-10R2 subunit acts as a second chain completing the assembly. Experiments performed with epithelial cells suggested both receptor subunits are required for the IL-26-dependent signal transduction. According to some observations, there is a possibility that additional IL-26 receptors exist.

Ligand binding by functional IL-26 receptor complex results in the initiation of a signal transduction pathway involving receptor-associated Janus tyrosine kinases JAK1 and TYK2. IL-20R1 interacts with JAK1, and IL-10R2 is associated with TYK2. Ligand-induced heterodimerization of receptor chains promotes cross-activation of Janus kinases, which phosphorylate receptor intracellular domains, leading to the activation of STAT protein family intracellular transcription factors STAT1 and STAT3. In addition, IL-26 activates extracellular signal-regulated kinases (ERK)-1/2, c-Jun N-terminal kinase (JNK), mitogen-activated protein kinases (MAPKs), and protein kinase B (PKB).

While IL-10R2 is expressed on a wide variety of tissues, the expression of IL-20R1 is limited only to some tissues. Thus, the ability to respond to IL-26 is restricted by the expression of IL-20R1 subunit.

== Role ==
Interleukin 26 (IL-26) is an inflammatory mediator and a driver of chronic inflammation due to its ability to act as a carrier of extracellular DNA, and as an antimicrobial molecule through its capacity to form pores in bacterial membranes. These properties suggest that IL-26 can be categorized as a kinocidin.

IL-26 is a natural human antimicrobial that promotes immune sensing of bacterial and host cell death. IL-26 is a cationic amphipathic protein that kills extracellular bacteria via membrane-pore formation. Furthermore, Th17 cell–derived IL-26 formed complexes with bacterial DNA and self-DNA released by dying bacteria and host cells. The IL-26–DNA complexes triggered the production of type I interferon by plasmacytoid dendritic cells via activation of Toll-like receptor 9, but independently of the IL-26 receptor. Monocytes infected with intracellular bacterium Mycobacterium tuberculosis reacted by decreasing IL-26 production, and IL-26 serum concentrations were lower in tuberculosis patients. These data indicate that IL-26 may be involved in host defense against bacteria in more ways.

Concerning host defense to viruses, the role of IL-26 appears to be related to the expression of IL-26R by epithelial cells as these constitute the first barrier against many viruses. Elevated serum levels of IL-26 were detected in patients with chronic infection by hepatitis C virus. Moreover, the sensitivity of NK cells to IL-26 might trigger the ability to kill the virus-infected host cells.

So far, the role of IL-26 in acute inflammation has not been properly studied, and most biological functions of IL-26 have been identified in pathological situations that feature chronic inflammation. The expression of IL-26 is elevated in the inflamed colonic mucosa of patients with Crohn's disease and it was reported that IL-26 induces the expression of IL-8 and TNFα as well as IL-10 in human gut epithelial cells. This activation of epithelial cells involves STAT1 and/or STAT3. IL26 gene is also over-expressed in the joints of patients with spondyloarthritis and rheumatoid arthritis, in the sera and lesional skin tissues of psoriasis patients, and in the sera of multiple sclerosis patients.

A novel effect of IL-26 produced by donor-derived CD26+ CD4+ T cells on the pathophysiology of pulmonary chronic GVHD was observed in a murine model.

The roles of IL-26 in normal physiology remain unknown. By contrast to other IL-10 cytokine family members, no induction of primary human keratinocyte proliferation in response to IL-26 has been detected.
