= Interleukin 20 receptor, alpha subunit =

Protein-coding gene in the species Homo sapiens

IL20RA

Identifiers
- Aliases: IL20RA, CRF2-8, IL-20R-alpha, IL-20R1, IL-20RA, Interleukin 20 receptor, alpha subunit, interleukin 20 receptor subunit alpha
- External IDs: OMIM: 605620; MGI: 3605069; GeneCards: IL20RA
Available structures
PDB	Ortholog search: PDBe RCSB
PDB	List of PDB id codes 4DOH

Gene location (Human)
Chr.	Chromosome 6 (human)
Band	6q23.3	Start	136,999,971 bp
Band	6q23.3	End	137,045,180 bp

Gene location (Mouse)
Chr.	Chromosome 10 (mouse)
Band	10|10 A3	Start	19,588,318 bp
Band	10|10 A3	End	19,635,801 bp
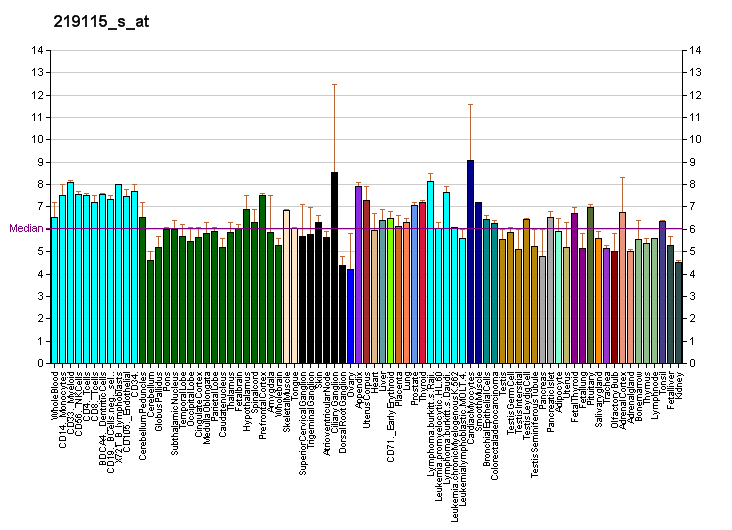
RNA expression pattern
Bgee	Human / Mouse (ortholog); Top expressed in: olfactory zone of nasal mucosa; skin of abdomen; right uterine tube; skin of leg; bronchial epithelial cell; testicle; endometrium; skin of thigh; palpebral conjunctiva; skin of arm / Top expressed in: embryo; embryo; skin of external ear; lumbar subsegment of spinal cord; spermatid; lip; neural layer of retina; superior frontal gyrus; skin of abdomen; epiblast; More reference expression data
BioGPS	More reference expression data
Gene ontology
Molecular function	cytokine receptor activity; interleukin-20 binding; protein binding
Cellular component	integral component of membrane; membrane; plasma membrane
Biological process	regulation of bone resorption; positive regulation of intrinsic apoptotic signaling pathway; cytokine-mediated signaling pathway
Sources:Amigo / QuickGO
Orthologs
Databases	NCBI: entry; OMA: entry
Species	Human	Mouse
Entrez	53832	237313
Ensembl	ENSG00000016402	ENSMUSG00000020007
UniProt	Q9UHF4	Q6PHB0
RefSeq (mRNA)	NM_001278722; NM_001278723; NM_001278724; NM_014432	NM_172786
RefSeq (protein)	NP_001265651; NP_001265652; NP_001265653; NP_055247	NP_766374
Location (UCSC)	Chr 6: 137 – 137.05 Mb	Chr 10: 19.59 – 19.64 Mb
PubMed search
- Wikidata
View/Edit Human	View/Edit Mouse

Interleukin 20 receptor, alpha subunit, is a subunit of the interleukin-20 receptor, the interleukin-26 receptor, and the interleukin-24 receptor. The interleukin 20 receptor, alpha subunit is also referred to as IL20R1 or IL20RA. The IL20RA receptor is involved in both pro-inflammatory and anti-inflammatory responses, signaling through the JAK-STAT pathway.

== Tissue distribution ==
IL20RA is found in the skin, lungs, ovaries, testes and placenta, with low gene expression in the intestine and liver. IL20RB is found in many organ resident effector cells such as keratinocytes at the skin epidermis, osteoclasts, found in bones, and epithelial cells of the intestine and trachea. IL20RA is also found in some immune cells.

== Structure and function ==
IL20RA is an alpha-chain with a long intracellular domain. IL20RA, along with the IL-20 receptor, beta subunit, form the heterodimeric interleukin-20 receptor, which binds the cytokines IL-19, IL-20 and IL-24. IL20RA also forms a complex with the IL-10 receptor, beta subunit, which binds the cytokine IL-26.

== Signaling ==
Receptors made up of IL20RA signal through a JAK-STAT signaling pathway. In this pathway, after a cytokine binds IL20RA and the beta subunit, JAKs linked to intracellular domains of IL20R activate and phosphorylate tyrosine residues found in the longer alpha chains of IL20RA. STAT then binds to docking sites created by JAK phosphorylation and becomes phosphorylated by JAK. STATs then dimerize and move to the nucleus to act as transcription factors. The specific genes expressed are dependent on the specific JAK, STAT, as well as by SOCS proteins, which can inhibit the JAK-STAT signal, regulating it.where the transcription factor STAT3 binds to IL20RA and STAT3 becomes activated.^{[1]} IL20RA has multiple docking sites for STAT3.

== Clinical significance ==
Research indicates that IL20RA is found in some immune cells. For example, IL20RA is sometimes found in lung macrophages. Research indicates that IL20RA presence may be related to disease. In people with rheumatoid arthiritis, IL20RA is present in blood monocytes.

IL20RA has also been linked with psoriasis, and atherosclerosis, all diseases associated with inflammation. The specific role of IL20RA in these diseases is unknown.
