= Interleukin 22 =

Protein, encoded in humans by IL22 gene

IL22
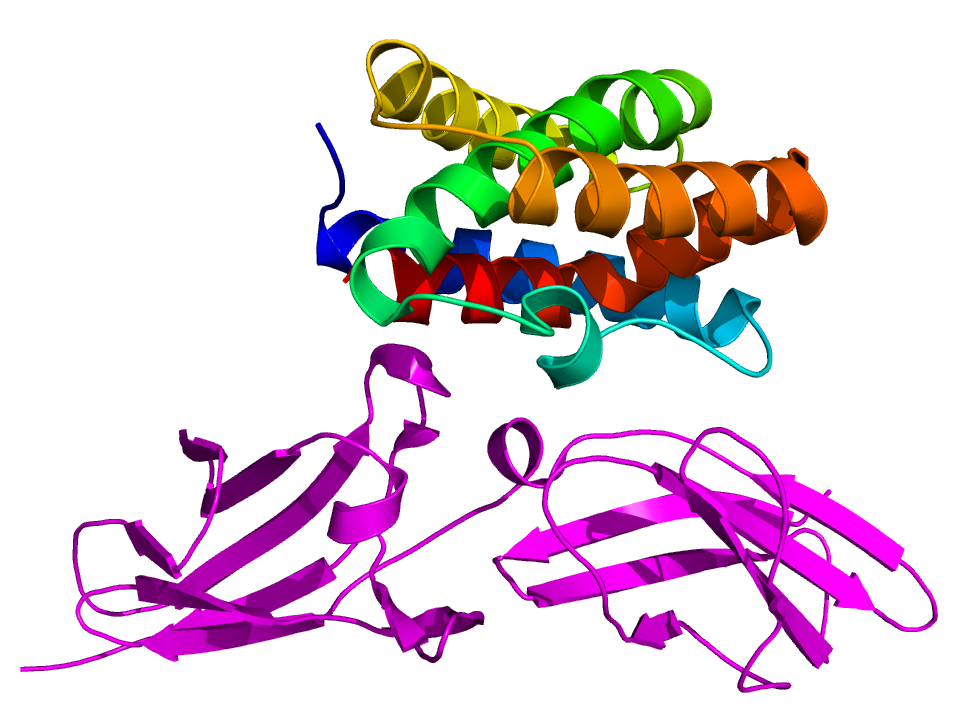

Identifiers
- Aliases: IL22, IL-21, IL-22, IL-D110, IL-TIF, ILTIF, TIFIL-23, TIFa, zcyto18, interleukin 22
- External IDs: OMIM: 605330; MGI: 2151139; GeneCards: IL22
Available structures
PDB	Ortholog search: PDBe RCSB
PDB	List of PDB id codes 1M4R, 1YKB, 3DGC, 3DLQ, 3G9V, 3Q1S

Gene location (Human)
Chr.	Chromosome 12 (human)
Band	12q15	Start	68,248,242 bp
Band	12q15	End	68,253,604 bp

Gene location (Mouse)
Chr.	Chromosome 10 (mouse)
Band	10|10 D2	Start	118,125,534 bp
Band	10|10 D2	End	118,130,943 bp
RNA expression pattern
Bgee	Human / Mouse (ortholog); Top expressed in: appendix; muscle tissue; granulocyte; mucosa of pharynx; epithelium of esophagus; thigh; duodenum; muscle of thigh; tonsil; urinary bladder / Top expressed in: morula; primary oocyte; cerebellum; secondary oocyte; cerebellar cortex; zygote; blastocyst; neural layer of retina; dentate gyrus of hippocampal formation granule cell; mesencephalon; More reference expression data
BioGPS	n/a
Gene ontology
Molecular function	protein binding; interleukin-22 receptor binding; cytokine activity
Cellular component	extracellular space; extracellular region
Biological process	response to glucocorticoid; acute-phase response; inflammatory response; regulation of signaling receptor activity; cytokine-mediated signaling pathway
Sources:Amigo / QuickGO
Orthologs
Databases	NCBI: entry; OMA: entry
Species	Human	Mouse
Entrez	50616	116849
Ensembl	ENSG00000127318	ENSMUSG00000090461
UniProt	Q9GZX6	Q9JJY8
RefSeq (mRNA)	NM_020525	NM_054079
RefSeq (protein)	NP_065386	NP_473420
Location (UCSC)	Chr 12: 68.25 – 68.25 Mb	Chr 10: 118.13 – 118.13 Mb
PubMed search
- Wikidata
View/Edit Human	View/Edit Mouse

Interleukin-22 (IL-22) is a protein that in humans is encoded by the IL22 gene.

== Structure ==
IL-22 is an α-helical cytokine. IL-22 binds to a heterodimeric cell surface receptor composed of IL-10R2 and IL-22R1 subunits. IL-22R is expressed on tissue cells, and it is absent on immune cells.

Crystallization is possible if the N-linked glycosylation sites are removed in mutants of IL-22 bound with high-affinity cell-surface receptor sIL-22R1. The crystallographic asymmetric unit contained two IL-22-sIL-22R1 complexes.

== Function ==
IL-22 is produced by several populations of immune cells at a site of inflammation. Producers are αβ T-cell classes T_{h}1, T_{h}22 and T_{h}17 along with γδ T cells, NKT, ILC3, neutrophils and macrophages. IL-22 takes effect on non-hematopoietic cells – mainly stromal and epithelial cells. Effects involve stimulation of cell survival, proliferation and synthesis of antimicrobials including S100, Reg3β, Reg3γ and defensins. It is also thought to play a role in regulating lipid metabolism, glucose homeostasis, and mitochondrial function in hepatic and pancreatic tissue. IL-22 thus participates in both wound healing and in protection against microbes. IL-22 dysregulation takes part in pathogenesis of several autoimmune diseases like systemic lupus erythematosus, rheumatoid arthritis and psoriasis.

IL-22 biological activity is initiated by binding to a cell-surface complex composed of IL-22R1 and IL-10R2 receptor chains and further regulated by interactions with a soluble binding protein, IL-22BP, which shares sequence similarity with an extracellular region of IL-22R1 (sIL-22R1). IL-22 and IL-10 receptor chains play a role in cellular targeting and signal transduction to selectively initiate and regulate immune responses. IL-22 can contribute to immune disease through the stimulation of inflammatory responses, S100s and defensins. IL-22 also promotes hepatocyte survival in the liver and epithelial cells in the lung and gut similar to IL-10. In some contexts, the pro-inflammatory versus tissue-protective functions of IL-22 are regulated by the often co-expressed cytokine IL-17A

== Target tissue ==
Targets of this cytokine are mostly non-hematopoietic cells – epithelial and stromal cells of following tissues and organs: liver, lung, skin, thymus, pancreas, kidney, gastrointestinal tract, synovial tissues, heart, breast, eye and adipose tissue.

== Signaling ==
IL-22 is a member of a group of cytokines called the IL-10 family or IL-10 superfamily (including IL-19, IL-20, IL-24, and IL-26), a class of potent mediators of cellular inflammatory responses. It shares use of IL-10R2 in cell signaling with other members of this family, IL-10, IL-26, IL-28A/B and IL-29.

IL-22, signals through the interferon receptor-related proteins CRF2-4 and IL-22R. It forms cell surface complexes with IL-22R1 and IL-10R2 chains resulting in signal transduction through receptor, IL-10R2. The IL-22/IL-22R1/IL-10R2 complex activates intracellular kinases (JAK1, Tyk2, and MAP kinases) and transcription factors, especially STAT3. It can induce IL-20 and IL-24 signaling when IL-22R1 pairs with IL-20R2.

== Regulation of production ==
IL-22 production is induced mainly through IL-23 receptor signalling. IL-23 is produced by dendritic cells after recognition of ligands by specific Toll-like receptors especially in combination with Dectin-1 and or NOD2 signalling. IL-1β stimulates IL-22 production too. On the other hand IL-22 binding protein is a soluble inhibitor which blocks receptor binding site of IL-22.
