= Interleukin 24 =

Protein found in humans

IL24
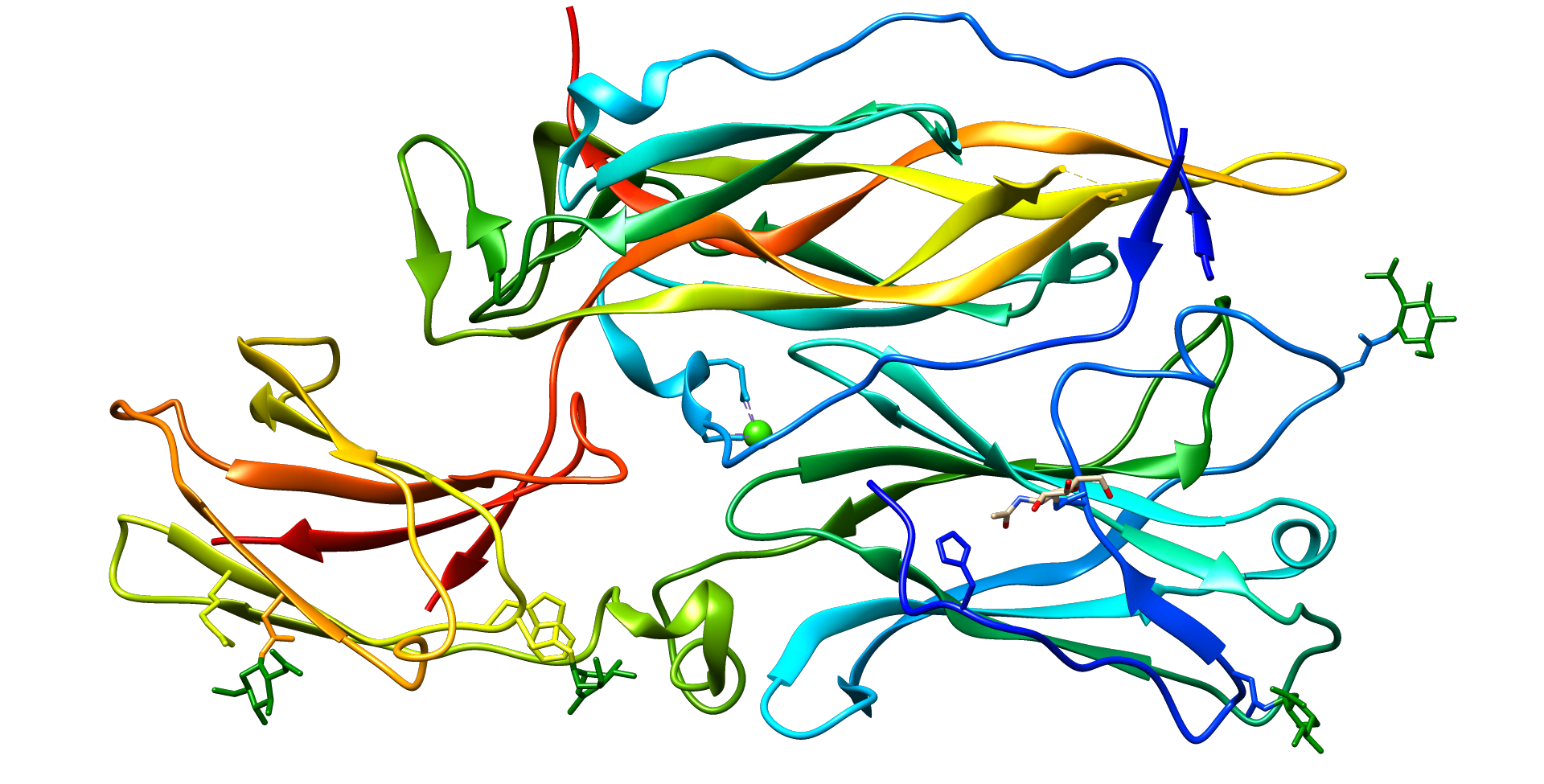

Identifiers
- Aliases: IL24, C49A, FISP, IL10B, MDA7, MOB5, ST16, IL-24, interleukin 24
- External IDs: OMIM: 604136; MGI: 2135548; GeneCards: IL24
Available structures
PDB	Ortholog search: PDBe RCSB
PDB	List of PDB id codes 3JVF, 6DF3, 6GG1

Gene location (Human)
Chr.	Chromosome 1 (human)
Band	1q32.1	Start	206,897,443 bp
Band	1q32.1	End	206,904,139 bp

Gene location (Mouse)
Chr.	Chromosome 1 (mouse)
Band	1|1 E4	Start	130,809,811 bp
Band	1|1 E4	End	130,815,191 bp
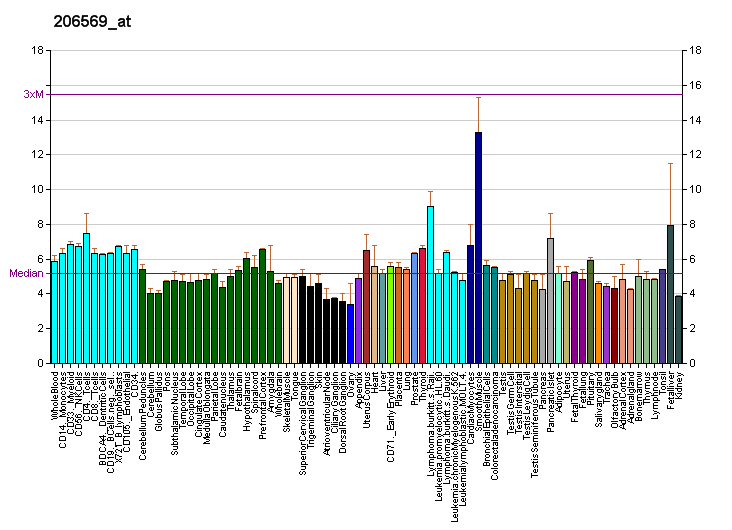
RNA expression pattern
Bgee	Human / Mouse (ortholog); Top expressed in: buccal mucosa cell; cartilage tissue; islet of Langerhans; granulocyte; testicle; spleen; blood; lymph node; stromal cell of endometrium; appendix / Top expressed in: secondary oocyte; primary oocyte; submandibular gland; zygote; placenta; uterus; integument; skin; zone of skin; More reference expression data
BioGPS	More reference expression data
Gene ontology
Molecular function	protein binding; cytokine activity
Cellular component	extracellular region; extracellular space
Biological process	cellular response to interleukin-4; negative regulation of cell migration; wound healing; cellular response to lipopolysaccharide; positive regulation of cell population proliferation; negative regulation of cell population proliferation; apoptotic process; serine phosphorylation of STAT protein; positive regulation of tyrosine phosphorylation of STAT protein; regulation of signaling receptor activity; cytokine-mediated signaling pathway
Sources:Amigo / QuickGO
Orthologs
Databases	NCBI: entry; OMA: entry
Species	Human	Mouse
Entrez	11009	93672
Ensembl	ENSG00000162892	ENSMUSG00000026420
UniProt	Q13007	Q925S4
RefSeq (mRNA)	NM_001185156; NM_001185157; NM_001185158; NM_006850; NM_181339	NM_053095
RefSeq (protein)	NP_001172085; NP_001172086; NP_001172087; NP_006841	NP_444325
Location (UCSC)	Chr 1: 206.9 – 206.9 Mb	Chr 1: 130.81 – 130.82 Mb
PubMed search
- Wikidata
View/Edit Human	View/Edit Mouse

Interleukin 24 (IL-24) is a protein in the interleukin family, a type of cytokine signaling molecule in the immune system. In humans, this protein is encoded by the IL24 gene.

IL-24 is a cytokine belonging to the IL-10 family of cytokines that signals through two heterodimeric receptors: IL-20R1/IL-20R2 and IL-22R1/IL-20R2. This interleukin is also known as melanoma differentiation-associated 7 (mda-7) due to its discovery as a tumour suppressing protein. IL-24 appears to control cell survival and proliferation by inducing rapid activation of particular transcription factors called STAT1 and STAT3. This cytokine is predominantly released by activated monocytes, macrophages and T helper 2 (Th2) cells and acts on skin, lung, and reproductive tissues. IL-24 performs important roles in wound healing, arthritis, psoriasis and cancer. Several studies have shown that cell death occurs in cancer cells/cell lines following exposure to IL-24. The gene for IL-24 is located on chromosome 1 in humans.

== Structure ==
The structure of IL-24 has been found through crystallization by fusing a flexible linker with a ligand to its two receptors, IL-22R1 and IL-20R2. The structure revealed that there is a lack of disulfides, which is present in most cytokines, and is likely the reason why IL-24 is unstable compared to other interleukins.

IL-24 is a secreted protein that is highly conserved throughout evolution with sequence homology between species including yeast, dog, cat, monkey and cow. It is located on chromosome 1q32-33 in humans along with several other IL-10 cytokine family gene members. IL-24 encompasses seven exons and six introns. The cDNA of IL-24 is 1,718 base pairs in length and encodes a protein of 206 amino acid with a predicted molecular size of ˜24 kDa. IL-24 also contains an IL-10 signature motif at amino acids 101–121 shared by other IL-10 family member cytokines. IL-24 possibly can form functionally active dimers due to the presence of potential disulfide bonds. Researchers identified a number of splice variants of IL-24 lacking one or more exons. The signal peptide in IL-24 is two times the length as in other related human cytokines (51 amino acids), and the predicted molecular mass of IL-24 monomer is 18.3 kDa.

== Function ==
IL-24 functions as a cytokine (at low concentrations). Its normal physiological role is connected with wound healing (In normal skin cells, it suppress keratinocyte proliferation during wound healing), and protection against diseases caused by bacteria (for example Mycobacterim tuberculosis, Salmonella typhimurium, Pseudomonas aeruginosa). It is also important in autoimmune diseases such as psoriasis, rheumatoid arthritis or spondyloarthropathy.

=== IL-24's Role in the Jak/STAT Pathway ===
IL-24 carries its functions through two types of membrane receptors (IL-22R1/IL-20R2 and IL-20R1/IL-20R2) with simultaneous activation of the JAK/signal transducer and activator of transcription (STAT) pathway within their cytoplasmic domains. IL-24 is a type of cytokine that interacts frequently with class 2 cytokine receptors. IL-24 can form IL-20R1/IL-20R2 and IL-22R1/IL-20R2 which are shared with the other IL-20SFCs and IL-22. IL-20SFC is an IL-20 subfamily of cytokines which includes IL-19, IL-20, and IL-24. They all signal through the common chain that is IL-20R2. Through these two types of membrane receptors (IL-22R1/IL-20R2 and IL-20R1/IL-20R2), simultaneous activation of the JAK/signal transducer and activator of transcription (STAT) pathway within their cytoplasmic domains.

Although it belongs to the same group of cytokines as IL-10, it has different effect on the immune system. IL-10 is a suppressive cytokine that suppresses inflammation while also maintaining immunomodulatory functions. Beside the normal physiological roles, IL-24 inhibits tumor growth, invasion, metastasis and angiogenesis.

=== Production of IL-24 by Different Cells ===
IL-24 can be produced by myeloid cells (in response to microbial products through TLRs), lymphoid cells, and epithelial cells in response to cytokine stimulation. IL-24 can also dampen the first rounds of CD8 cell expansion to prevent uncontrolled T cell responses. After the combination of anti-IgM and CD40-L stimulation, B lymphocytes can also induce IL-24 expression. In response to immune cells, non-lymphoid cells such as melanocytes can also produce IL-24.

== Cancer ==
IL-24 is an immunomodulatory cytokine which can also display broad cancer-specific suppressor effects. The tumor suppressor activities of IL-24 include inhibition of angiogenesis, sensitization to chemotherapy, and induction of cancer-specific apoptosis. Given its ubiquitous apoptotic effect on malignant cells, lack of an effect on normal cells, and absence of significant side effects, IL-24 is an important candidate for cancer therapy.

IL-24 is able to induce apoptosis via both intracellular and extracellular signaling mechanisms. Secreted IL-24 protein induces a robust expression of endogenous IL-24 and subsequent induction of tumor-specific killing through an ER stress-mediated pathway as well as by ROS production. The ER stress is the initial pathway in IL-24-induced apoptosis.

An important question, which remained unresolved, is why IL-24 has the abilities to selectively induce apoptosis in a large spectrum of human cancer-derived cell lines without harming normal cells. One possible reason for this differential killing effect involves inherent biochemical differences between normal and cancer cells (ER stress, ROS production and ceramide), another possibility is that IL-24 is able to target a molecule that only triggers apoptosis in cancer cells. The third option for this differential killing effect is that both of the above hypotheses are correct.

IL-24 is able to induce toxic autophagy in cancer cells in vitro and animal models in vivo. Past independent studies have also proven that the cytokine can play a role in inflammation for inflammatory bowel disease, psoriasis, cardiovascular disease, rheumatoid arthritis, tuberculosis, and viral infection.

Secondary cytokines that evoke antitumor immune responses are stimulated by IL-24. These secondary cytokines include TNF-α, IFN-gamma, and IL-1, which induce apoptosis. IL-24 also inhibits cancer by blocking VEGF and TGF-alpha activities through inhibition of Src, a proto-oncogene, within tumor cells and inhibiting epithelial cell differentiation. IL-24 also induces apoptosis By inducing more stress on the endoplasmic reticulum.
