= Eltrekibart =

Monoclonal antibody

Monoclonal antibody
- Type: ?

Clinical data
- Other names: LY3041658

Legal status
- Legal status: Investigational

Identifiers
- CAS Number: 2484883-56-7
- DrugBank: DB12556
- UNII: WB62WIH13E
- KEGG: D12556
- ChEBI: CHEBI:759325
- ChEMBL: ChEMBL5314628

Chemical and physical data
- Formula: C_{6496}H_{9986}N_{1726}O_{2052}S_{44}
- Molar mass: 146506.01 g·mol^{−1}

Eltrekibart (LY3041658) is a "septa-specific monoclonal antibody that neutralizes all seven ELR+ CXC chemokines (CXCL1-3 and CXCL5-8), thereby limiting signaling through CXCR1 and CXCR2". It was tested in clinical trials for hidradenitis suppurativa.
