= Interleukin 37 =

Protein-coding gene in the species Homo sapiens

IL37

Identifiers
- Aliases: IL37, FIL1, FIL1(ZETA), FIL1Z, IL-1F7, IL-1H, IL-1H4, IL-1RP1, IL-37, IL1F7, IL1H4, IL1RP1, interleukin 37, IL-23
- External IDs: OMIM: 605510; GeneCards: IL37

Gene location (Human)
| Chr. | Chromosome 2 (human) |
| Band | 2q14.1 | Start | 112,911,165 bp |
| Band | 2q14.1 | End | 112,918,882 bp |
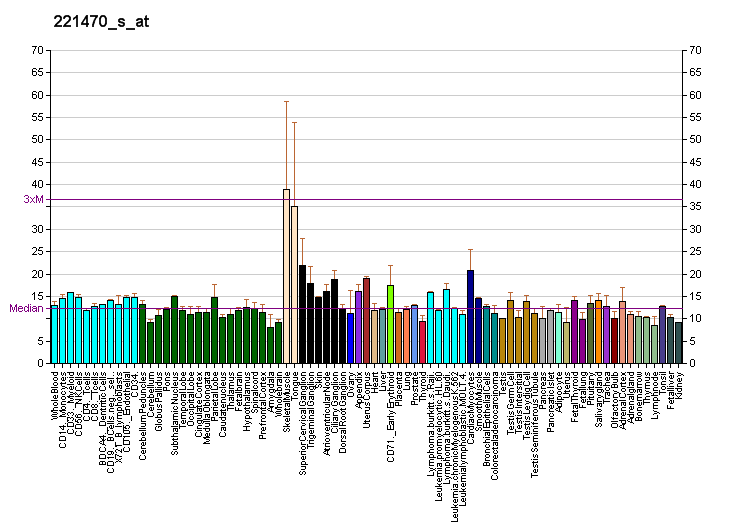
RNA expression pattern
| Bgee | Human / Mouse (ortholog); Top expressed in: skin of arm; skin of leg; skin of thigh; nipple; skin of abdomen; vena cava; skin of hip; subthalamic nucleus; body of tongue; ventral tegmental area / n/a; More reference expression data |
| BioGPS | More reference expression data |
Gene ontology
| Molecular function | cytokine activity; interleukin-1 receptor binding |
| Cellular component | extracellular region; extracellular space; nucleus; cytoplasm; intracellular membrane-bounded organelle; nucleoplasm; cytosol |
| Biological process | inflammatory response; immune response; cytokine-mediated signaling pathway; regulation of signaling receptor activity; cellular response to cytokine stimulus; neutrophil chemotaxis; positive regulation of interleukin-6 production; positive regulation of I-kappaB kinase/NF-kappaB signaling; positive regulation of JNK cascade; cellular response to lipopolysaccharide |
Sources:Amigo / QuickGO
Orthologs
| Databases | NCBI: entry; OMA: entry |
| Species | Human | Mouse |
| Entrez | 27178 | n/a |
| Ensembl | ENSG00000125571 | n/a |
| UniProt | Q9NZH6 | n/a |
| RefSeq (mRNA) | NM_014439; NM_173202; NM_173203; NM_173204; NM_173205 | n/a |
| RefSeq (protein) | NP_055254; NP_775294; NP_775295; NP_775296; NP_775297 | n/a |
| Location (UCSC) | Chr 2: 112.91 – 112.92 Mb | n/a |
| PubMed search | | n/a |
- Wikidata
| View/Edit Human |

Interleukin 37 (IL-37), also known as Interleukin-1 family member 7 (IL-1F7), is an anti-inflammatory cytokine important for the downregulation of pro-inflammatory cytokine production as well as the suppression of tumor cell growth.

== Gene location and structure ==
The IL-37 gene is in the human located on the long chromosome arm of chromosome 2. There has not been found any homolog gene in mice genome. IL-37 undergoes alternative splicing with 5 different splice variants depending on which of the 6 possible exons are being expressed: IL-37a-e. IL-37b is the largest and most studied one; it shares the beta barrel structure that is spread within the interleukin-1 family.

== Gene expression ==
IL-37a,b,c are being expressed in a variety of tissues - thymus, lung, colon, uterus, bone marrow. It is produced by immune cells, most of which are relevant to the immune inflammation response. Examples include natural killer cells, activated B lymphocytes, circulating blood monocytes, tissue macrophages, keratinocytes or epithelial cells.

Some IL-37 isoforms are tissue specific and have varying lengths depending on which exons are being expressed:

IL-37a is found in the brain. The isoform includes exons 3, 4, 5, and 6 and the isoform is 192 amino acids in length

IL-37b is found in the kidney, bone marrow, blood, skin, respiratory and urogenital tract. Exons 1, 2, 4, 5, and 6 are expressed and the isoform is 218 amino acids in length.

IL-37c is found in the heart, and contains exons 1, 2, 5, and 6 for a total amino acid length of 197.

IL-37d is found in the bone marrow and includes exons 1, 4, 5, and 6 for a total length of 197.

IL-37e is found in the testis and includes exons 1, 5, and 6 totaling 157 amino acids.

== Function ==
The mechanism of IL-37 functions is still to be elucidated. Known functions of IL-37 include anti-inflammatory effects, tumor suppression, and antimicrobial responses. IL-37 acts intracellulary and extracellulary, classifying the cytokine as dual-function.

=== IL-37 synthesis ===
IL-37, similar to other members of the interleukin-1 family, is synthesized by blood monocytes in a precursor form and secreted into the cytoplasm in response to inflammatory signaling. Examples of relevant inflammatory signals include TLR agonists, IL-1β, or TGF-β. Full maturation requires cleavage by Caspase-1.

=== Immune system inhibition ===
IL-37 is known to have immunosuppression properties through two different binding mechanisms:

Interaction with IL-18 cell surface receptors - Intracellular IL-37 can be released from cells following necrosis or apoptosis. IL-37 has two similar amino acid residues with IL-18, and thus extracellular IL-37 can interact with IL-18 receptor (IL-18R) and co-receptor IL-1 receptor 8 (IL-1R8). The affinity of IL-37b to IL-18R alpha subunit is much lower compared to IL-18. IL-37b interacts with IL-18 binding protein (IL-18BP), that is an antagonist of IL-18. The binding of IL-37b enhances the IL-18BP functions and can upregulate anti-inflammatory signals.

Binding to SMAD3 receptor - Mature intracellular IL-37 can form functional complexes with phosphorylated or unphosphorylated Smad3, which can be transported to the cell nucleus. Nucleus IL-37 can have a direct inhibition function on the expression of pro-inflammatory cytokine gene transcription. Affected cytokines include IL-1β, IFN-γ, IL-6, and TNF-α.

=== Tumor-controlled expression ===
IL-37 functions are active at low IL-37 concentrations. Higher concentrations leads to inactivation via dimer formation. Experiments also show that certain cancer strains correspond to changes in IL-37 expression levels. Breast cancer and ovarian cancer are associated with elevated expression of IL-37. Colon cancer, lung cancer, Multiple Myeloma, and Hepatoma Carcinoma were correlated with decreased expression of IL-37 expression in affected areas.

== See also ==
- Interleukin-1 family
- Interleukin 18
- Interleukin 18 receptor
- Interleukin 18 binding protein
- Inflammation
- Carcinogenesis
