= IL18RAP =

Protein-coding gene in the species Homo sapiens

Identifiers
- Aliases: IL18RAP, ACPL, CD218b, CDw218b, IL-18R-beta, IL-18RAcP, IL-18Rbeta, IL-1R-7, IL-1R7, IL-1RAcPL, IL18RB, interleukin 18 receptor accessory protein
- External IDs: OMIM: 604509; MGI: 1338888; GeneCards: IL18RAP
Available structures
PDB	Ortholog search: PDBe RCSB
PDB	List of PDB id codes 3WO4
Enzyme activity
EC #	BRENDA	ExPASy	KEGG	MetaCyc
3.2.2.6	↗	↗	↗	↗

Gene location (Human)
Chr.	Chromosome 2 (human)
Band	2q12.1	Start	102,418,689 bp
Band	2q12.1	End	102,452,565 bp

Gene location (Mouse)
Chr.	Chromosome 1 (mouse)
Band	1|1 B	Start	40,554,522 bp
Band	1|1 B	End	40,590,865 bp
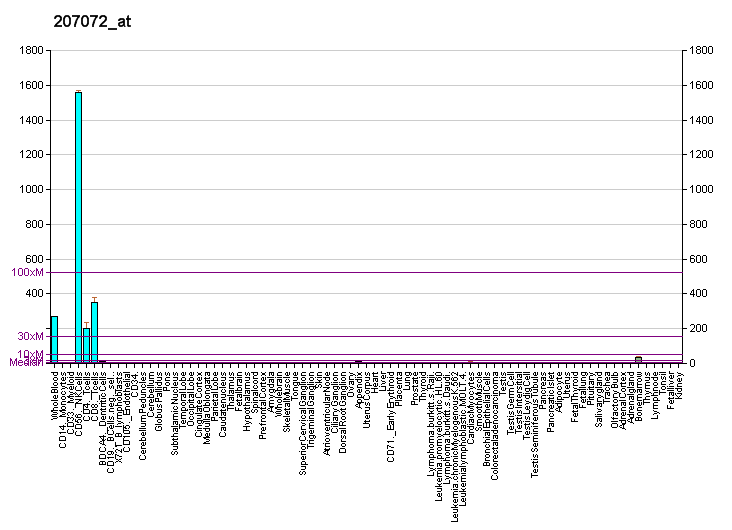
RNA expression pattern
Bgee	Human / Mouse (ortholog); Top expressed in: granulocyte; blood; bone marrow; spleen; trabecular bone; right lung; bone marrow cell; upper lobe of left lung; periodontal fiber; appendix / Top expressed in: granulocyte; blood; tibiofemoral joint; embryo; bone marrow; spleen; zygote; endothelial cell of lymphatic vessel; carotid body; subcutaneous adipose tissue; More reference expression data
BioGPS	More reference expression data
Gene ontology
Molecular function	signaling receptor activity; interleukin-18 receptor activity
Cellular component	integral component of membrane; membrane; plasma membrane; interleukin-18 receptor complex
Biological process	cell surface receptor signaling pathway; inflammatory response; immune response; cellular response to cytokine stimulus; signal transduction; cellular response to hydrogen peroxide; cell population proliferation; interleukin-6 production; T-helper 1 cell cytokine production; neutrophil activation; positive regulation of natural killer cell mediated cytotoxicity; cellular response to interleukin-18; interleukin-18-mediated signaling pathway; positive regulation of NF-kappaB transcription factor activity
Sources:Amigo / QuickGO
Orthologs
Databases	NCBI: entry; OMA: entry
Species	Human	Mouse
Entrez	8807	16174
Ensembl	ENSG00000115607	ENSMUSG00000026068
UniProt	O95256	Q9Z2B1
RefSeq (mRNA)	NM_003853	NM_010553
RefSeq (protein)	NP_003844	NP_034683
Location (UCSC)	Chr 2: 102.42 – 102.45 Mb	Chr 1: 40.55 – 40.59 Mb
PubMed search
- Wikidata
View/Edit Human	View/Edit Mouse

Interleukin 18 receptor accessory protein, also known as IL18RAP and CDw218b (cluster of differentiation w218b), is a human gene.

== Function ==
The protein encoded by this gene is an accessory subunit of the heterodimeric receptor for IL18. This protein enhances the IL18 binding activity of IL18R1 (IL1RRP), a ligand binding subunit of IL18 receptor. The coexpression of IL18R1 and this protein is required for the activation of NF-κB and MAPK8 (JNK) in response to IL18.

== Disease association ==
Variants at IL18RAP have been linked to susceptibility to Coeliac disease.

== See also ==
- Interleukin-18 receptor
