= SIGIRR =

Protein-coding gene in the species Homo sapiens

Identifiers
- Aliases: SIGIRR, TIR8, single immunoglobulin and toll-interleukin 1 receptor (TIR) domain, IL-1R8, single Ig and TIR domain containing
- External IDs: OMIM: 605478; MGI: 1344402; GeneCards: SIGIRR

Gene location (Human)
Chr.	Chromosome 11 (human)
Band	11p15.5	Start	405,716 bp
Band	11p15.5	End	417,455 bp

Gene location (Mouse)
Chr.	Chromosome 7 (mouse)
Band	7|7 F5	Start	140,671,088 bp
Band	7|7 F5	End	140,680,485 bp
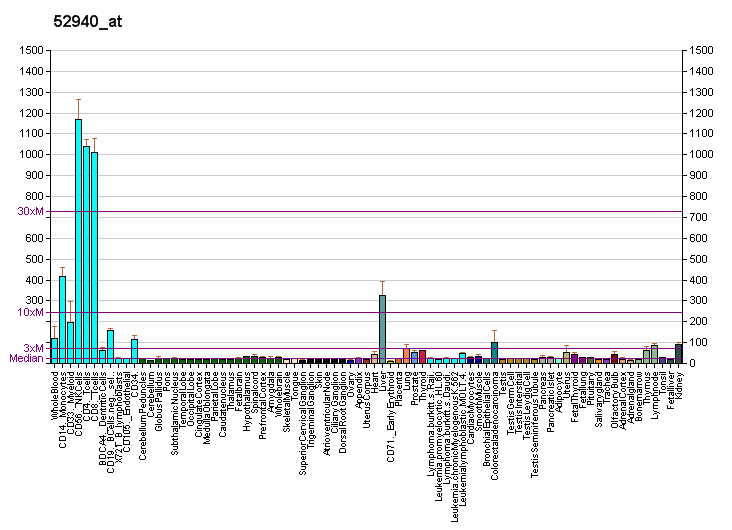

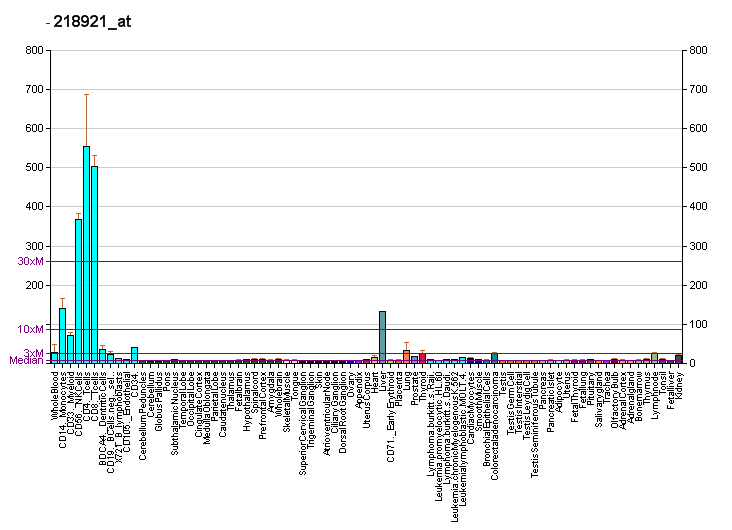
RNA expression pattern
Bgee	Human / Mouse (ortholog); Top expressed in: granulocyte; mucosa of transverse colon; right lobe of liver; right uterine tube; apex of heart; olfactory zone of nasal mucosa; spleen; body of stomach; C1 segment; left uterine tube / Top expressed in: yolk sac; right kidney; proximal tubule; human kidney; epithelium of small intestine; thymus; intestinal villus; crypt of lieberkuhn of small intestine; ileum; submandibular gland; More reference expression data
BioGPS	More reference expression data
Gene ontology
Molecular function	protein binding
Cellular component	integral component of membrane; membrane; plasma membrane
Biological process	negative regulation of cytokine-mediated signaling pathway; acute-phase response; negative regulation of DNA-binding transcription factor activity; signal transduction; negative regulation of lipopolysaccharide-mediated signaling pathway; cellular response to cytokine stimulus
Sources:Amigo / QuickGO
Orthologs
Databases	NCBI: entry; OMA: entry
Species	Human	Mouse
Entrez	59307	24058
Ensembl	ENSG00000185187	ENSMUSG00000025494
UniProt	Q6IA17	Q9JLZ8
RefSeq (mRNA)	NM_001135053; NM_001135054; NM_021805	NM_023059; NM_001355055
RefSeq (protein)	NP_001128525; NP_001128526; NP_068577	NP_075546; NP_001341984
Location (UCSC)	Chr 11: 0.41 – 0.42 Mb	Chr 7: 140.67 – 140.68 Mb
PubMed search
- Wikidata
View/Edit Human	View/Edit Mouse

Single Ig IL-1-related receptor (SIGIRR), also called Toll/Interleukin-1 receptor 8 (TIR8) or Interleukin-1 receptor 8 (IL-1R8), is transmembrane protein encoded by gene SIGIRR, which modulate inflammation, immune response, and tumorigenesis of colonic epithelial cells.

== Gene ==
Human gene SIGIRR is localized on chromosome 11. It is composed of 10 exons spanning about 11,700 base pairs. In mice, this gene is on chromosome 7, where it is composed of 9 exons spanning about 9,400 base pairs.

== Structure ==
SIGIRR is a 410 amino acids long protein. In contrast with other members of IL-1 receptor family it has only 1 immunoglobulin (Ig) domain in its N terminal extracellular part instead of 3 Ig domains. After this domain, there is a transmembrane domain, which is anchored to the plasmatic membrane. It has a TIR domain and 95 amino acids long C terminal tail in the intracellular part, which is not present in other IL-1 receptor family members. Structure of the TIR domain is different in the case of SIGIRR. In its tertiary structure SIGIRR lacks amino acids Ser447 and Tyr536, which are important for IL-1R1 signalization. Instead of these amino acids SIGIRR contains Cys222 and Leu305. The functional importance of these differences is not known so far. Human and mouse SIGIRR protein sequences are 82% identical, and they are overall 23% identical with IL-1R1. SIGIRR is extensively glycosylated on its extracellular domain, and loss of this modification impairs its function.

== Expression ==
SIGIRR is expressed in several epithelial tissues, particularly in epithelial cells of kidneys, digestive tract, liver, lungs, and in lymphoid organs. It is also expressed in monocytes, B lymphocytes, T lymphocytes, dendritic cells, and NK cells. In general, its expression is downregulated during inflammation or infection. Its reduced expression was also found in patients with chronic lymphoid leukemia, or in cells from colonic cancer. In human cells from colonic cancer, it was observed that there was an increased expression of one variant of SIGIRR. This variant lacks its exon 8, is not glycosylated and its function is impaired. It also inhibits glycosylation of the Wild type variant as its transported to the plasmatic membrane.

One of the discovered transcription factor, which regulates the expression of SIGIRR, is SP1. It binds to the proximal part of the promoter of the SIGIRR gene and induce its transcription. Binding of SP1 on SIGIRR promoter is inhibited by the activation of p38 MAP kinase, which is activated through the TLR4 signalization. Treatment of mice with a small amount of lipopolysaccharide, which is a ligand of TLR4, this causes reduction in SIGIRR expression.

== Function ==
SIGIRR negatively regulates the activation of the IL-1R1, IL18R1, IL-1R5/ST2, TLR4, TLR7, TLR3, TLR9, and TLR1/2 and inhibits activation of transcription factor NF-κB and JNK MAP kinase.

SIGIRR interacts with IL-1R1 when it binds to IL-1. N terminal extracellular immunoglobulin domain associates with IL-1R1 and blocks its heterodimerization with IL-1RAP. In addition, C terminal TIR domain of SIGIRR binds downstream elements of IL-1R1 signalization and prevents the constitution of the functional signaling complex. Deletion of these domains disrupts the regulation activity of SIGIRR. SIGIRR uses a slightly different mechanism to regulate the activity of TLR4 by binding to the receptor complex around TLR4. TIR domain of SIGIRR is crucial for interaction with TLR4, and it also interacts with downstream elements of the TLR4 pathway. In contrast, the extracellular immunoglobulin domain of SIGIRR is dispensable for the inhibition of TLR4 signaling. There are 2 mechanisms, which are proposed for explanation of the inhibition of the TLR4 pathway. First is that SIGIRR blocks the formation of signaling complex at activated TLR4 and the second is that SIGIRR prevents translocation of this signalization complex into a cytosol. SIGIRR inhibits signal transduction by its interaction with TLRs, IL-1R1 and downstream signaling proteins, and in this manner, it participates in negative regulation of inflammation. SIGIRR also prevents homodimerization of MYD88, and it also prevents signalization through adaptor protein TRIF which is used, for example, by TLR3.

Negative regulation of IL-1R pathway by SIGIRR has its effect on the differentiation of T_{h17} lymphocytes. IL-1 supports differentiation for T_{h17} lymphocytes and expression of transcription factors RORγt and IRF4. Treatment by this cytokine also activates mTOR kinase and promotes the proliferation of T_{h17} lymphocytes. SIGIRR-deficient T lymphocytes lack this negative regulation, and it favors mTOR-dependent differentiation and proliferation of T_{h17} lymphocytes. SIGIRR also negatively regulates TLRs, IL-1R pathway, and following mTOR activation in intestinal epithelial cells. Ligands for TLRs in the intestine are mainly components of intestinal microflora. Its deficiency or expression of mutated form in these cells leads to the signalization, which promotes inflammation, proliferation and increases incidence of tumors and its size.

=== SIGIRR as a coreceptor of IL-1R5 for IL-37 binding ===
SIGIRR takes part in mediating the anti-inflammatory IL-37 signalization. It interacts with IL-37, IL-18R1 and forms tripartite signaling complex. Activity of this complex transduce anti-inflammatory signal and is essential for manifestation of IL-37 activity. Upon this signalization it causes inhibition of components of NF-κB pathway, kinases mTOR, TAK1, FYN, p38, JNK, ERK and it also causes activation of phosphatase PTEN, kinase MER, transcription factor STAT3 and adaptor protein p62 (DOK1). Pre-treatment of mice by IL-37 before injection of lipopolysaccharide reduced examined levels of pro-inflammatory cytokines and, also reduced their weight loss and hypothermia. This protective effect of IL-37 was abolished by deletion of SIGIRR, reduction of its expression or neutralization of IL-37 by antibodies.

In addition to the regulation of inflammation, IL-37 also affects metabolism. Stimulation of skeletal muscle cells by IL-37 increases level of AMP-dependent kinase, increases its activation and induces metabolic reprogramming. It causes increase of oxidative phosphorylation, Krebs cycle, nucleotide, amino acids metabolism, and decrease of inflammatory mediators levels. This response does not occur in case of SIGIRR deficiency
