= CXCL1 =

Mammalian protein found in humans

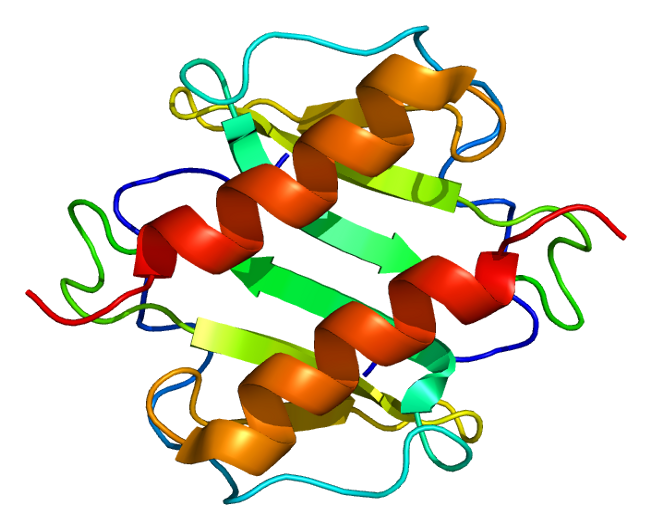

Identifiers
- Aliases: CXCL1, FSP, GRO1, GROa, MGSA, MGSA-a, NAP-3, SCYB1, C-X-C motif chemokine ligand 1
- External IDs: OMIM: 155730; MGI: 1340094; GeneCards: CXCL1
Available structures
PDB	Ortholog search: PDBe RCSB
PDB	List of PDB id codes 1MGS, 1MSG, 1MSH

Gene location (Human)
Chr.	Chromosome 4 (human)
Band	4q13.3	Start	73,869,393 bp
Band	4q13.3	End	73,871,308 bp

Gene location (Mouse)
Chr.	Chromosome 5 (mouse)
Band	5 E1|5 44.78 cM	Start	91,051,730 bp
Band	5 E1|5 44.78 cM	End	91,053,797 bp
RNA expression pattern
Bgee	Human / Mouse (ortholog); Top expressed in: olfactory zone of nasal mucosa; periodontal fiber; spleen; cartilage tissue; palpebral conjunctiva; epithelium of bronchus; mucosa of paranasal sinus; bronchial epithelial cell; nasal epithelium; epithelium of nasopharynx / Top expressed in: granulocyte; stroma of bone marrow; embryo; endothelial cell of lymphatic vessel; embryo; islet of Langerhans; spermatid; lumbar subsegment of spinal cord; lumbar spinal ganglion; thymus; More reference expression data
BioGPS	n/a
Gene ontology
Molecular function	signaling receptor binding; growth factor activity; cytokine activity; enzyme activator activity; CXCR chemokine receptor binding; chemokine activity
Cellular component	extracellular region; extracellular space; specific granule lumen; tertiary granule lumen
Biological process	negative regulation of cell population proliferation; intracellular signal transduction; response to lipopolysaccharide; signal transduction; G protein-coupled receptor signaling pathway; nervous system development; positive regulation of neutrophil chemotaxis; cell population proliferation; actin cytoskeleton organization; immune response; chemokine-mediated signaling pathway; positive regulation of catalytic activity; cell chemotaxis; chemotaxis; defense response; inflammatory response; neutrophil degranulation; antimicrobial humoral immune response mediated by antimicrobial peptide; regulation of signaling receptor activity; cytokine-mediated signaling pathway; neutrophil chemotaxis; leukocyte chemotaxis; cellular response to lipopolysaccharide
Sources:Amigo / QuickGO
Orthologs
Databases	NCBI: entry; OMA: entry
Species	Human	Mouse
Entrez	2919	20310
Ensembl	ENSG00000163739	ENSMUSG00000058427
UniProt	P09341	P10889
RefSeq (mRNA)	NM_001511	NM_009140
RefSeq (protein)	NP_001502	NP_033166
Location (UCSC)	Chr 4: 73.87 – 73.87 Mb	Chr 5: 91.05 – 91.05 Mb
PubMed search
- Wikidata
View/Edit Human	View/Edit Mouse

The chemokine (C-X-C motif) ligand 1 (CXCL1) is a small peptide belonging to the CXC chemokine family that acts as a chemoattractant for several immune cells, especially neutrophils or other non-hematopoietic cells to the site of injury or infection and plays an important role in regulation of immune and inflammatory responses. It was previously called GRO1 oncogene, GROα, neutrophil-activating protein 3 (NAP-3) and melanoma growth stimulating activity, alpha (MGSA-α). CXCL1 was first cloned from a cDNA library of genes induced by platelet-derived growth factor (PDGF) stimulation of BALB/c-3T3 murine embryonic fibroblasts and named "KC" for its location in the nitrocellulose colony hybridization assay. This designation is sometimes erroneously believed to be an acronym and defined as "keratinocytes-derived chemokine". Rat CXCL1 was first reported when NRK-52E (normal rat kidney-52E) cells were stimulated with interleukin-1β (IL-1β) and lipopolysaccharide (LPS) to generate a cytokine that was chemotactic for rat neutrophils, cytokine-induced neutrophil chemoattractant (CINC). In humans, this protein is encoded by the gene CXCL1 and is located on human chromosome 4 among genes for other CXC chemokines.

== Structure and expression ==
CXCL1 exists as both monomer and dimer and both forms are able to bind chemokine receptor CXCR2. However, CXCL1 chemokine is able to dimerize only at higher (micromolar) concentrations and its concentrations are only nanomolar or picomolar upon normal conditions, which means that the form of WT CXCL1 is more likely monomeric while dimeric CXCL1 is present only during infection or injury. CXCL1 monomer consists of three antiparallel β-strands followed by C- terminal α-helix and this α-helix together with the first β-strand are involved in forming a dimeric globular structure.

Upon normal conditions, CXCL1 is not expressed constitutively. It's produced by a variety of immune cells such as macrophages, neutrophils and epithelial cells, or Th17 population. Moreover, its expression can be also induced indirectly by IL-1, TNF-α or IL-17 produced again by Th17 cells and is triggered mainly by activation of NF-κB or C/EBPβ signaling pathways predominantly involved in inflammation and leading to production of other inflammatory cytokines.

== Function ==
CXCL1 has a potentially similar role as interleukin-8 (IL-8/CXCL8). After binding to its receptor CXCR2, CXCL1 activates phosphatidylinositol-4,5-bisphosphate 3-kinase-γ (PI3Kγ)/Akt, MAP kinases such as ERK1/ERK2 or phospholipase-β (PLCβ) signaling pathways. CXCL1 is expressed at higher levels during inflammatory responses thus contributing to the process of inflammation. CXCL1 is also involved in the processes of wound healing and tumorigenesis.

== Role in cancer ==
CXCL1 has a role in angiogenesis and arteriogenesis and thus has been shown to act in the process of tumor progression. The role of CXCL1 was described by several studies in the development of various tumors, such as breast cancer, gastric and colorectal carcinoma or lung cancer. Also, CXCL1 is secreted by human melanoma cells, has mitogenic properties and is implicated in melanoma pathogenesis.

== Role in nervous system and sensitization ==
CXCL1 plays a role in spinal cord development by inhibiting the migration of oligodendrocyte precursors. CXCR2 receptor for CXCL1 is expressed in the brain and spinal cord by neurons and oligodendrocytes and during CNS pathologies such as Alzheimer's disease, multiple sclerosis and brain injury also by microglia. An initial study in mice showed evidence that CXCL1 decreased the severity of multiple sclerosis and may offer a neuro-protective function. On the other hand, on the periphery, CXCL1 contributes to the release of prostaglandins and thus causes increased sensitivity to pain and drives nociceptive sensitization via recruitment of neutrophils to the tissue. Phosphorylation of ERK1/ERK2 kinases and activation of NMDA receptors leads to transcription of genes inducing chronic pain, such as c-Fos or cyclooxygenase-2 (COX-2).
