= NP3-146 =

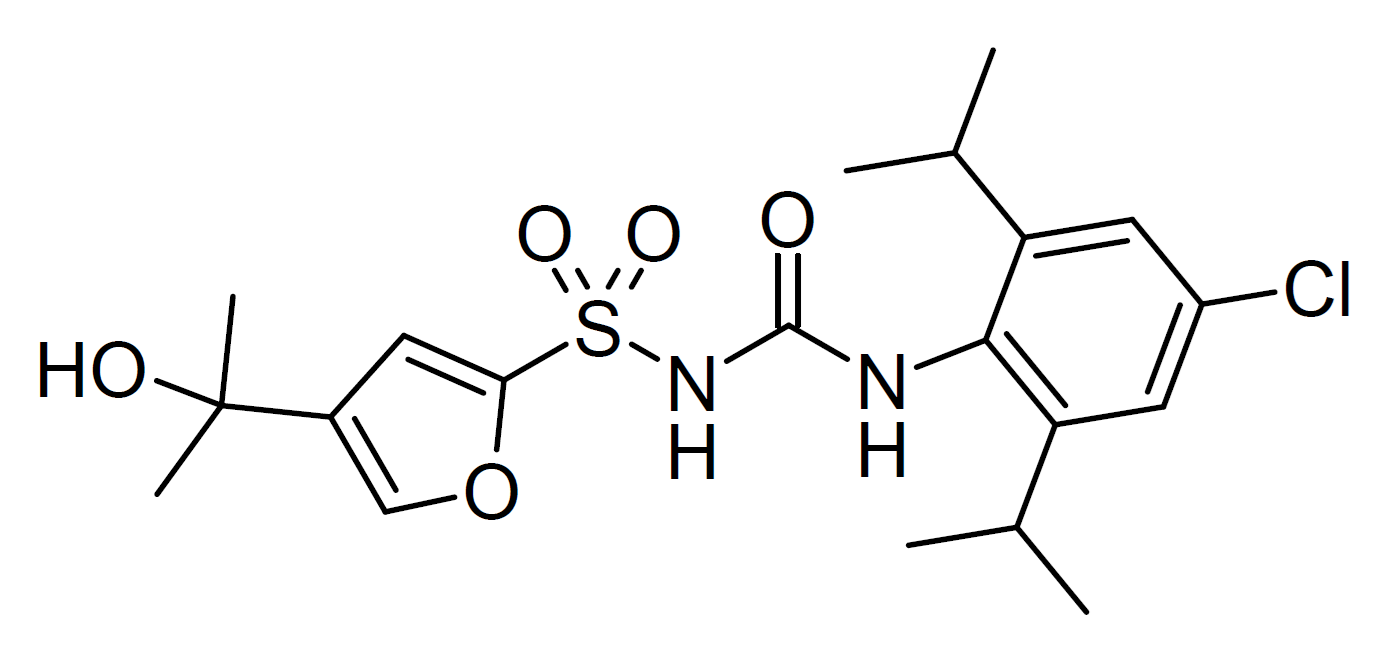

Identifiers
- IUPAC name: 1-[4-chloro-2,6-di(propan-2-yl)phenyl]-3-[4-(2-hydroxypropan-2-yl)furan-2-yl]sulfonylurea
- CAS Number: 210826-47-4
- PubChem CID: 10195003
- ChemSpider: 8370503
- ChEMBL: ChEMBL5397828

Chemical and physical data
- Formula: C_{20}H_{27}ClN_{2}O_{5}S
- Molar mass: 442.96 g·mol^{−1}
- 3D model (JSmol): Interactive image
- SMILES: CC(C)C1=CC(=CC(=C1NC(=O)NS(=O)(=O)C2=CC(=CO2)C(C)(C)O)C(C)C)Cl
- InChI: InChI=1S/C20H27ClN2O5S/c1-11(2)15-8-14(21)9-16(12(3)4)18(15)22-19(24)23-29(26,27)17-7-13(10-28-17)20(5,6)25/h7-12,25H,1-6H3,(H2,22,23,24); Key:RTJGVFANTDWUEG-UHFFFAOYSA-N

NP3-146 (NLRP3-IN-5) is an experimental drug which acts as an inhibitor of the NLRP3 inflammasome. It inhibits the release of interleukin-1β and interleukin-18 which is usually triggered by inflammatory stimuli, and so terminates the resulting signalling cascade. It is used for research into various conditions in which chronic inflammation plays a role.

== See also ==
- Bay 11-7082
- YQ128
