= Bay 11-7082 =

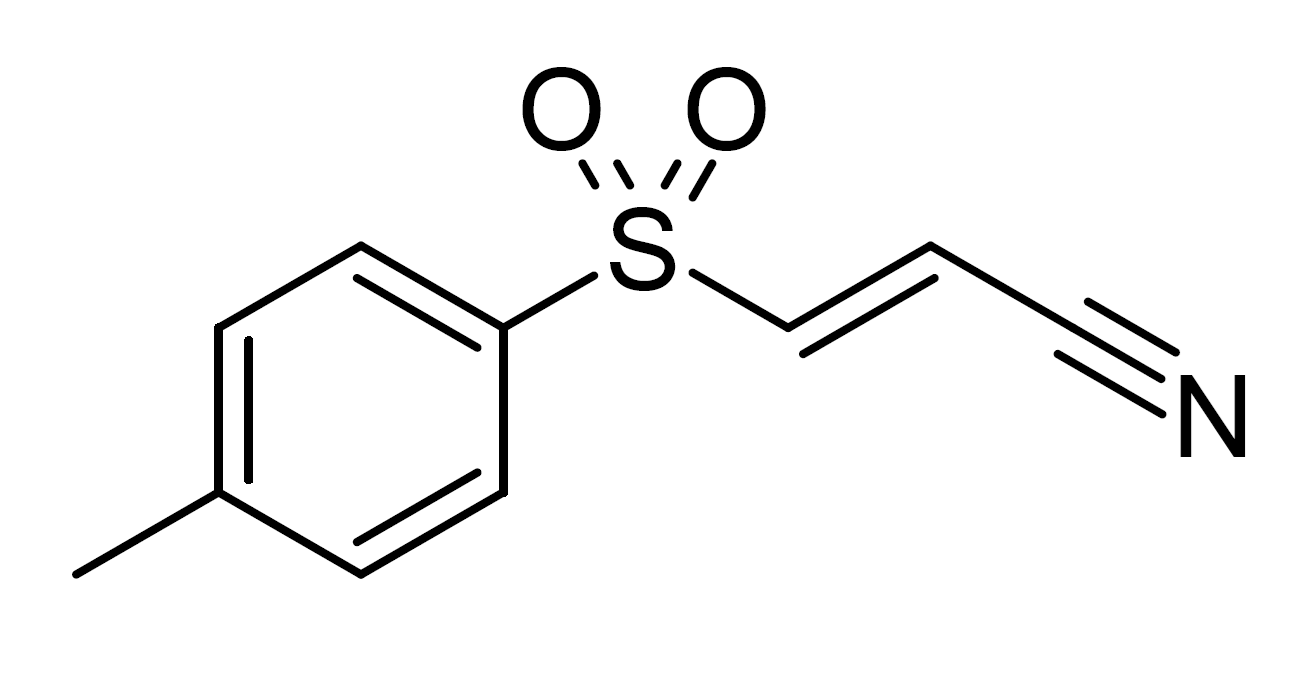

Identifiers
- IUPAC name: (E)-3-(4-methylphenyl)sulfonylprop-2-enenitrile
- CAS Number: 19542-67-7
- PubChem CID: 5353431
- IUPHAR/BPS: 5934
- ChemSpider: 4510086
- UNII: 4Y5G2A4F6O
- ChEBI: CHEBI:85928
- ChEMBL: ChEMBL403183
- CompTox Dashboard (EPA): DTXSID90859645 DTXSID3041459, DTXSID90859645
- ECHA InfoCard: 100.232.898

Chemical and physical data
- Formula: C_{10}H_{9}NO_{2}S
- Molar mass: 207.25 g·mol^{−1}
- 3D model (JSmol): Interactive image
- SMILES: CC1=CC=C(C=C1)S(=O)(=O)/C=C/C#N
- InChI: InChI=1S/C10H9NO2S/c1-9-3-5-10(6-4-9)14(12,13)8-2-7-11/h2-6,8H,1H3/b8-2+; Key:DOEWDSDBFRHVAP-KRXBUXKQSA-N

Bay 11-7082 is an experimental drug which acts as an inhibitor of the NFκB pathway and the NLRP3 inflammasome. It has antiinflammatory effects and has potential applications in the treatment of conditions such as dermatitis, COVID-19, irritable bowel syndrome and certain forms of cancer.

== See also ==
- NP3-146
- YQ128
