= SIGIR =

SIGIR may refer to:

- Special Inspector General for Iraq Reconstruction
- Special Interest Group on Information Retrieval, part of the Association for Computing Machinery

== See also ==
- SIGIRR, a human protein and gene
- Sigiri or Sigiriya, an ancient rock fortress in Sri Lanka
