= Interleukin-8 receptor =

7-transmembrane protein

Interleukin-8 Receptor, alpha

Identifiers
- Symbol: IL8RA
- Alt. symbols: CMKAR1, CXCR1, CKR-1, CDw128a, CD181

Other data
- Locus: Chr. 2 q35

Interleukin-8 Receptor, beta

Identifiers
- Symbol: IL8RB
- Alt. symbols: CXCR2, CKR-2, CDw128b

Other data
- Locus: Chr. 2 q35

The interleukin-8 receptors (IL-8R) are two 7-transmembrane proteins in the G-protein coupled-receptor family: interleukin-8 receptor A (IL-8RA) and interleukin-8 receptor B (IL-8RB). These receptors are generally found on human neutrophils, a type of white blood cell of the myeloid lineage, with approximately 65,000 receptors per neutrophil. Both receptors have a size of 60kDa, are glycosylated (contains covalent attachments and modifications) and G-protein linked, and can cause an increase in intracellular Ca^{2+} levels. Binding of Interleukin 8 leads to activation of the cell (commonly a neutrophil), allowing it to recruit more white blood cells to the site of Interleukin 8 release and to produce enzymes that would assist in the destruction of foreign material at the site of infection

== Structure ==
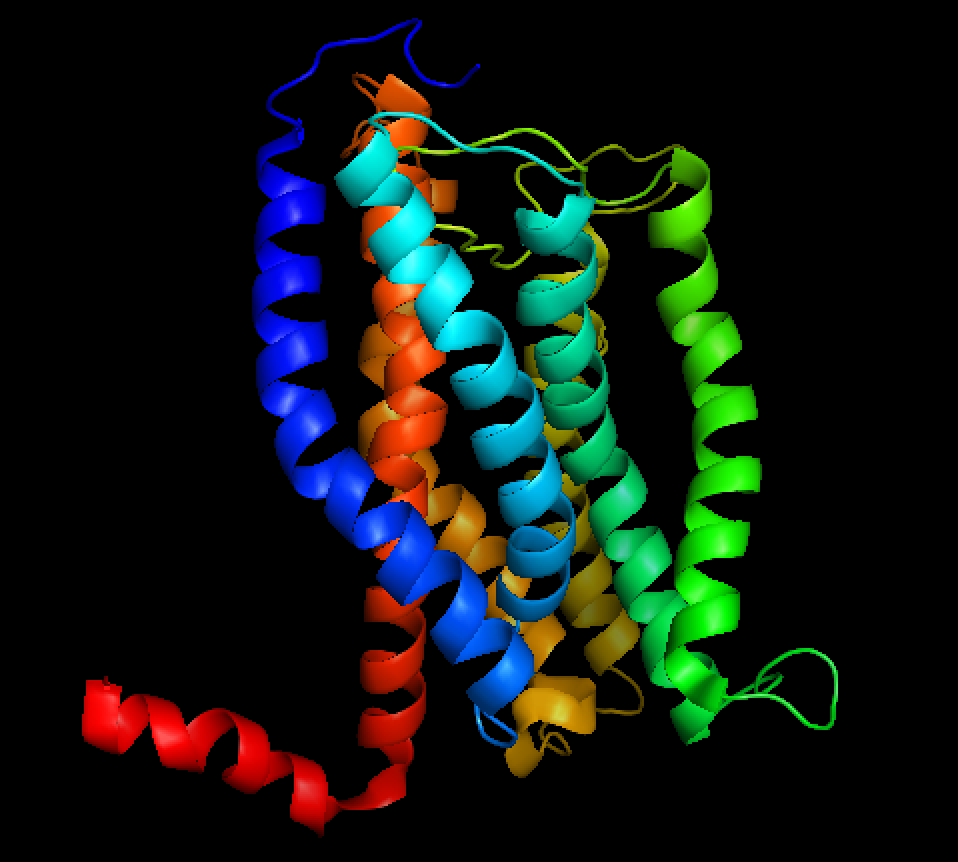
A ribbon-cartoon model of IL-8RA. IL-8RB is nearly identical in appearance. The N-terminus is located at the blue end of the ribbon and the C-terminus is at the red end.

IL-8 receptors are 7-transmembrane proteins; they contain 7 alpha helices that each span the thickness of the phospholipid bilayer of a cell membrane. IL-8RA is a peptide of 350 amino acids, and IL-8RB is composed of 355 amino acids. Receptors A and B share 78% of their sequence identity, and are considered to be the only two biologically significant receptors of IL-8. The genes for both receptors are located on chromosome 2q35 and are each encoded by a single exon, and are 20 kb apart in distance. The close proximity and location of these two genes on the chromosome suggest that they are derived from the same ancestor sequence. The reported size of the translated protein is approximately 40kD, differing from the native purified receptors from the surface of neutrophils by 20kD. This difference could be due to the N-terminus glycosylations that occur post-translation and contribute to an increase in apparent size of the mature receptor.

=== N-terminus activity ===
The amino terminus of the receptors is located on the extracellular side of the protein, and function to determine the binding specificity of ligands to the receptor. The N-terminus of both receptors A and B are rich in acidic residues, which correlate to their high binding affinities for IL-8, which is rich in basic residues. Asp11 on the N-terminus, Glu275 and Arg280 (both on the loop between the 7th and 6th transmembrane domains) are the three main peptide residues that participate in ligand binding on IL-8A. IL-8B shows a similar binding structure. These three residues are brought close together via a disulfide bridge.

=== C-terminus activity ===
The carboxyl terminus of the receptors is located on the intracellular side of the protein, and is rich in serine and threonine residues (a characteristic of many proteins of the 7-transmembrane G-protein coupled receptor family). The C-terminus is a target for phosphorylation and exhibits kinase activity. This is the beginning of signaling pathways and phosphorylation cascades to recruit neutrophils and angiogenesis, the development and growth of new blood vessels.

== Expression and function ==
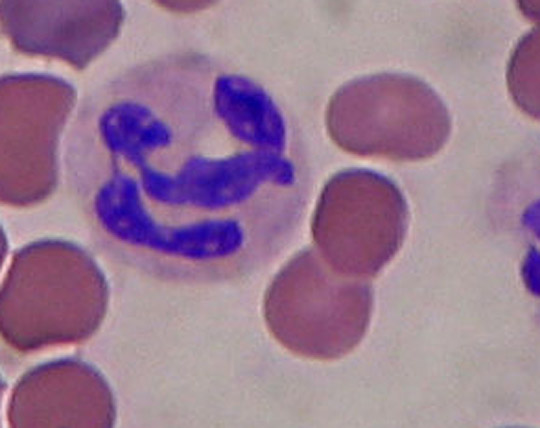
A neutrophil in among a population of red blood cells. Neutrophils are the main target cells for IL-8, and contain a large number of IL-8 receptors on their cell surfaces. Binding causes a neutrophil to migrate to the site of infection.

Both IL-8RA and IL-8RB are expressed in neutrophils, monocytes, macrophages, basophils, T-lymphocytes, and endothelial cells. IL-8RB is expressed additionally in neurons of the central nervous system. IL-8RA is highly specific for interleukin-8 and only responds when this particular ligand is bound to its receptor site, exhibiting "specific" binding behavior. IL-8RB binds to IL-8 with the same affinity as IL-8RA, but also binds to neutrophil-activating protein 2 (NAP-2) and other small receptor molecules of the CXC chemokine family with lower affinity than IL-8 binding, exhibiting a "shared" binding behavior. Chemokines are a class of small molecules that induce the recruitment of leukocytes and stimulate pro-inflammatory responses; the responsiveness of IL-8R to chemokines suggests that is heavily involved in recruitment of white blood cells for inflammatory and immunological response purposes.

The binding of IL-8 to the receptor induces the following three main responses in neutrophils, all of which assist a neutrophil in developing molecular mechanisms to target and kill pathogens: shape and conformational change of the neutrophil (which allows for transendothelial migration of the cell), degranulation (causing the release of enzymes within the cell), and the dissociation of heterotrimeric G-proteins (a typical effect of ligands binding to 7TM G-protein coupled receptors), thereby activating them. The activation of G-proteins leads to signal transduction and phosphorylation cascades, with the ultimate effect of changing gene expression of the neutrophil to allow for recruitment of other white blood cells to the local area.
