= CXCR2 antagonist =

Pharmacological agent class

CXCR2 antagonist are a class of pharmacological agents that inhibit the activity of the G-protein-coupled receptors (GPCR) CXCR2 receptor. Cxcr2 is involved in immune cell infiltration and inflammation. These receptors are highly expressed on neutrophils and immunosuppressive granulocytic myeloid suppressor cells (g-MDSCs) where it regulates their recruitment and function. In addition, CXCR2 is implicated in tumor progression and angiogenesis in several types of cancers.

Several pre-clinical studies have demonstrated that inhibition of CXCR2 are effective in reducing tumor burden and metastatic spread in various models. Several antagonist of CXCR2 including, monoclonal antibodies and small molecule antagonists that target CXCR2 signaling axis are being evaluated in clinical trials.

Examples of CXCR2 antagonists include AZD5069, danirixin, and SB225002, SCH-527123, SB-656933 and SCH-479833.
