= Interleukin-1 receptor associated kinase =

The interleukin-1 receptor (IL-1R) associated kinase (IRAK) family plays a crucial role in the protective response to pathogens introduced into the human body by inducing acute inflammation followed by additional adaptive immune responses. IRAKs are essential components of the Interleukin-1 receptor signaling pathway and some Toll-like receptor signaling pathways. Toll-like receptors (TLRs) detect microorganisms by recognizing specific pathogen-associated molecular patterns (PAMPs) and IL-1R family members respond the interleukin-1 (IL-1) family cytokines. These receptors initiate an intracellular signaling cascade through adaptor proteins, primarily, MyD88. This is followed by the activation of IRAKs. TLRs and IL-1R members have a highly conserved amino acid sequence in their cytoplasmic domain called the Toll/Interleukin-1 (TIR) domain. The elicitation of different TLRs/IL-1Rs results in similar signaling cascades due to their homologous TIR motif leading to the activation of mitogen-activated protein kinases (MAPKs) and the IκB kinase (IKK) complex, which initiates a nuclear factor-κB (NF-κB) and AP-1-dependent transcriptional response of pro-inflammatory genes. Understanding the key players and their roles in the TLR/IL-1R pathway is important because the presence of mutations causing the abnormal regulation of Toll/IL-1R signaling leading to a variety of acute inflammatory and autoimmune diseases.

IRAKs are membrane proximal putative serine-threonine kinases. Four IRAK family members have been described in humans: IRAK1, IRAK2, IRAKM, and IRAK4. Two are active kinases, IRAK-1 and IRAK-4, and two are inactive, IRAK-2 and IRAK-M, but all regulate the nuclear factor-κB (NF-κB) and mitogen-activated protein kinase (MAPK) pathways.

Some special/significant features of each IRAK family member:

- There is some evidence that IRAK-1 functions in regulating other signaling cascades leading to NF-κB activation. One signaling pathway in particular nerve growth factor (NGF) may be dependent on the function of IRAK-1 in its signaling pathway for its activation and cell survival.
- IRAK-2 has 4 isoforms IRAK-2a, IRAK-2b, IRAK-2c, and IRAK-2d. The latter two have negative feedback in the TLR signaling pathways. IRAK-2a and IRAK-2b positively activate NF-κB/TLR pathway by stimulating LPS.
- IRAK-M is specific to monomyeloic cells (monocytes and macrophages) while the other IRAKs that are ubiquitously expressed. IRAK-M negatively regulates TLR signaling by inhibiting the IRAK-4/IRAK-1 complex
- The newest described IRAK family member, IRAK-4, has been found to be critical for the recruitment of IRAK-1 and for its activation/degradation. IL-1 stimulates IRAK-4 to the IL-1R complex initiating the Toll/IL-1 receptor signaling cascade upstream of IRAKs, so the deletion of IRAK-1 does not abolish the activation of NF-κB and mitogen-activated protein kinase pathways.

== Discovery ==
IRAKs were first identified in 1994 by Michael Martin and colleagues when they successfully co-precipitated a protein kinase with type I interleukin-1 receptors (IL-1RI) from human T cells. They speculated that this kinase was the link between the T cell's transmembrane IL-1 receptor and the cytosolic signalling pathway's downstream components.

The name “IRAK” came from Zhaodan Cao and colleagues in 1995. The DNA sequence analysis of IRAK's domains revealed many conserved amino acids with the serine/threonine specific protein kinase Pelle in Drosophila, that functions downstream of a Toll receptor. Cao's lab confirmed the kinase's activity as necessarily associated with the IL-1 receptor by immunoprecipitating the IL-1 receptors from different cell types treated with IL-1 and without IL-1. Even cells without over-expressed IL-1 receptors showed kinase activity when exposed to IL-1, and were able to co-precipitate a protein kinase with endogenous IL-1 receptors. Thus the human IL-1 receptor's accessory protein was named Interleukin-1 Receptor-Associated Kinase.

In 1997, MyD88 was identified as the cytosolic protein that recruits IRAKs to the cytosolic domains of IL-1 receptors, mediating IL-1's signal transduction to the cytosolic signal cascade. Subsequent studies associated IRAKs with multiple signalling pathways triggered by interleukin, and specified multiple IRAK types.

== Structure ==
=== Functional domains ===
All IRAK family members are multidomain proteins consisting of a conserved N-terminal Death Domain (DD) and a central kinase domain (KD). The DD is a protein interaction motif that important for interacting with other signaling molecules such as the adaptor protein MyD88 and other IRAK members. The KD is responsible for the kinase activity of IRAK proteins and consists of 12 subdomains. All IRAK KDs have an ATP binding pocket with an invariable lysine residue in subdomain II, however, only IRAK-1 and IRAK-4 have an aspartate residue in the catalytic site of subdomain VI, which is thought to be critical for kinase activity. It is thought that IRAK-2 and IRAK-M are catalytically inactive because they lack this aspartate residue in the KD.

The C-terminal domain does not seem to show much similarity between IRAK family members. The C-terminal domain is important for the interaction with the signaling molecule TRAF6. IRAK-1 contains three TRAF6 interaction motifs, IRAK-2 contains two and IRAK-M contains one.

IRAK-1 contains a region that is rich in serine, proline, and threonine (proST). It is thought that IRAK-1 undergoes hyperphosphorylation in this region. The proST region also contains two proline (P), glutamic acid (E), serine (S) and threonine (T)-rich (PEST) sequences that are thought to promote the degradation of IRAK-1.

== Role in immune signaling ==
=== Interleukin-1 receptor signaling ===
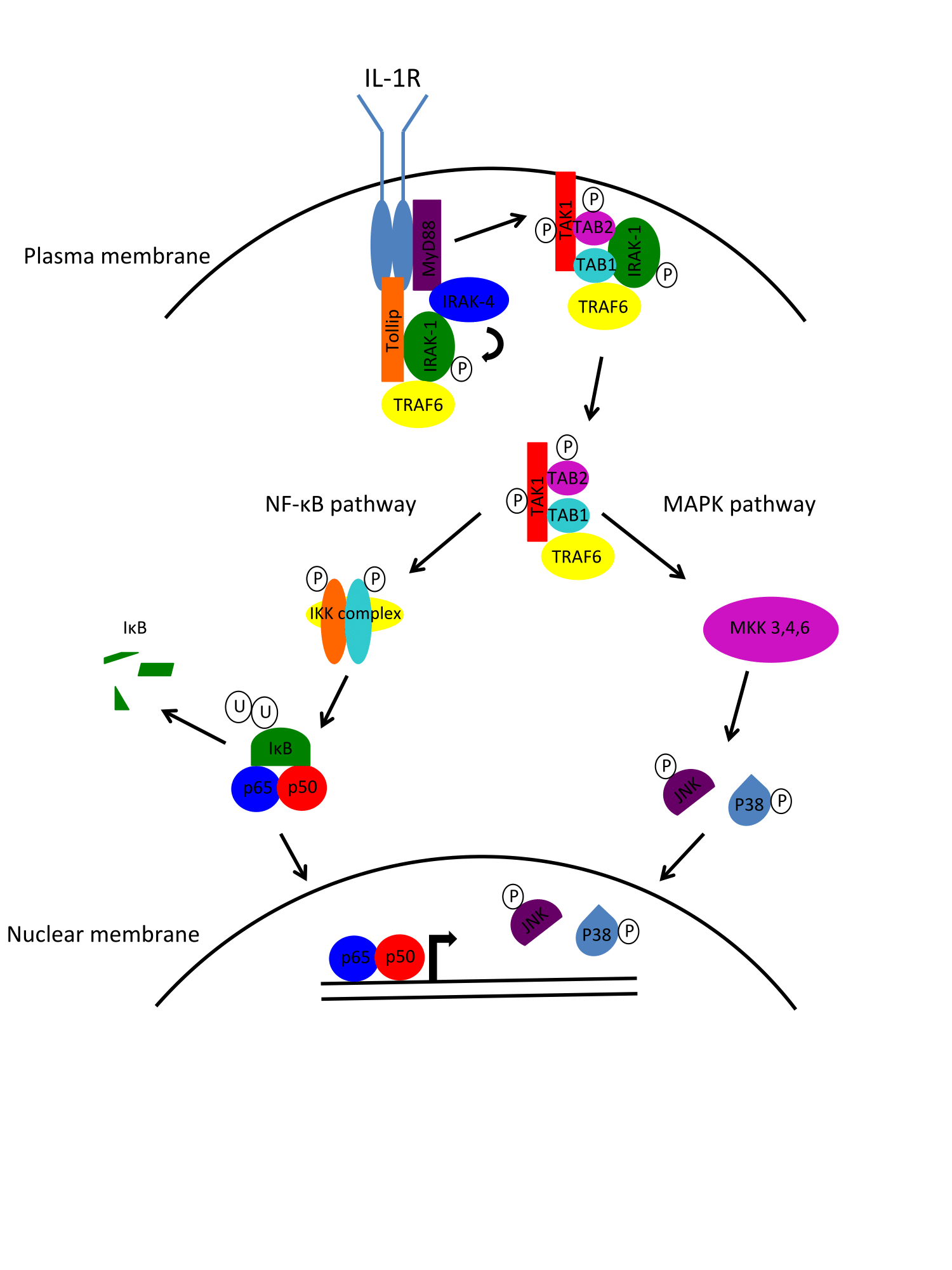
IL-1R Signaling pathway

Interleukin-1 receptors (IL-1Rs) are cytokine receptors that transduce an intracellular signaling cascade in response to the binding of the inflammatory cytokine interleukin-1 (IL-1). This signaling cascade results in the initiation of transcription of certain genes involved in inflammation. Because IL-1Rs do not possess intrinsic kinase activity, they rely on the recruitment of adaptor molecules, such as IRAKs, to transduce their signals.

IL-1 binding to IL-1R complex triggers the recruitment of the adaptor molecule MyD88 through interactions with the TIR domain. MyD88 brings IRAK-4 to the receptor complex. Preformed complexes of the adaptor molecule Tollip and IRAK-1 are also recruited to the receptor complex, allowing IRAK-1 to bind MyD88. IRAK-1 binding to MyD88 brings it into close proximity with IRAK-4 so that IRAK-4 can phosphorylate and activate IRAK-1. Once phosphorylated, IRAK-1 recruits the adaptor protein TNF receptor associated factor 6 (TRAF6) and the IRAK-1-TRAF6 complex dissociates from the IL-1R complex. The IRAK-1-TRAF6 complex interacts with a pre-existing complex at the plasma membrane consisting of TGF-β activated kinase 1 (TAK1), and two TAK binding proteins, TAB1 and TAB2. TAK1 is a mitogen-activated protein kinase kinase kinase (MAPKKK). This interaction leads to the phosphorylation of TAB2 and TAK1, which then translocate to the cytosol with TRAF6 and TAB1. IRAK-1 remains at the membrane and is targeted for degradation by ubiquitination. Once the TAK1-TRAF6-TAB1-TAB2 complex is in the cytosol, ubiquitination of TRAF6 in triggers the activation of TAK1 kinase activity. TAK1 can then activate two transcription pathways, the nuclear factor-κB (NF-κB) pathway and the mitogen-activated protein kinase (MAPK) pathway. To activate the NF-κB pathway, TAK1 phosphorylates the IκB kinase (IKK) complex, which subsequently phosphorylates the NF-κB inhibitor, IκB, targeting it for degradation by the proteasome. Once IκB is removed, the NF-κB proteins p65 and p50 are free to translocate into the nucleus and activate transcription of proinflammatory genes. To activate the MAPK pathway, TAK1 phosphorylates MAPK kinase (MKK) 3/4/6, which then phosphorylate members of the MAPK family, c-Jun N-terminal kinase (JNK) and p38. Phosphorylated JNK/p38 can then translocate into the nucleus and phosphorylate and activate transcription factors such as c-Fos and c-Jun.

=== Toll-like receptor signaling ===
Toll-like receptors (TLRs) are important innate immune receptors that recognize pathogen associated molecular patterns (PAMPs) and initiate the appropriate immune response to eliminate a particular pathogen. PAMPs are conserved motifs associated with microorganisms that are not found in host cells, such as, bacterial lipopolysaccharide (LPS), viral double-stranded RNA, etc. TLRs are similar to IL-1Rs in that they do not possess intrinsic kinase activity and require adaptor molecules to relay their signals. Stimulation of TLRs can also result in NF-κB and MAPK mediated transcription, similar to the IL-1R signaling pathway.

It has been shown that IRAK-1 is essential for TLR7 and TLR9 interferon (IFN) induction. TLR7 and TLR9 in plasmacytoid dendritic cells (pDCs) recognize viral nucleic acids and trigger the production of interferon-α (IFN-α), an important cytokine for inducing an antiviral state in host cells. TLR7 and TLR9 mediated IFN-α induction requires the formation of a complex consisting of MyD88, TRAF6 and the interferon regulatory factor 7 (IRF7). IRF7 is a transcription factor that translocates into the nucleus when activated and initiates transcription of IFN-α. IRAK-1 was shown to directly phosphorylates IRF7 in vitro and the kinase activity of IRAK-1 was shown to be essential for IRF7 transcriptional activation. It was subsequently shown that IRAK-1 is required for the activation of interferon regulatory factor 5 (IRF5). IRF5 is another transcription factor that induces IFN production following stimulation of TLR7, TLR8 and TLR9 by specific viruses. In order to be activated, IRF5 must be polyubiquitinated by TRAF6. It has been shown that TRAF6-mediated ubiquitination of IRF5 is dependent on the kinase activity of IRAK-1.

IRAK-1 has also been shown to play a critical role in TLR4 interleukin-10 (IL-10) induction. TLR4 recognizes bacterial LPS and triggers the transcription of IL-10, a cytokine regulating the inflammatory response. IL-10 transcription is activated by signal transducer and activator of transcription 3 (STAT3). IRAK-1 forms a complex with STAT3 and the IL-10 promoter element in the nucleus and is required for STAT3 phosphorylation and activation of IL-10 transcription.

IRAK-2 plays an important role in TLR-mediated NF-κB activation. Knocking down IRAK-2 has been shown to impair NF-κB activation by TLR3, TLR4 and TLR8. The mechanism of how IRAK-2 functions is still unknown, however, IRAK-2 has been shown to interact with a TIR adaptor protein that does not bind to IRAK-1, called Mal/TIRAP. Mal/TIRAP has been specifically implicated in TLR2 and TLR4 mediated NF-κB signaling. In addition, it has been shown that IRAK-2 is recruited to the TLR3 receptor. IRAK-2 is the only IRAK family member that is known to play a role in TLR3 signaling.

One of the most distinct features of IRAK-M is that it is a negative regulator of TLR signaling to prevent excessive inflammation. It is thought that IRAK-M enhances the binding of MyD88 to IRAK-1 and IRAK-4, preventing IRAK-1 from dissociating from the receptor complex and inducing downstream NF-κB and MAPK signaling. It has also been shown that IRAK-M negatively regulates the alternative NF-κB pathway in TLR2 signaling. The alternative NF-κB pathway is predominantly triggered by CD40, lymphotoxin β receptor (LT), and the B-cell activating receptor belonging to the TNF family (BAFF receptor). The alternative NF-κB pathway involves the activation of NF-κN-inducing kinase (NIK) and subsequent phosphorylation of the transcription factors p100/RelB in an IKKα-dependent mechanism. It was observed that IRAK-M knockout resulted in increased induction of the alternative NF-κB pathway but not the classical pathway. The mechanism by which IRAK-M inhibits NF-κB signaling is still unknown.

IRAK-4 is an essential component of MyD88 mediated signaling pathways and is therefore critical for both IL-1R and TLR signaling. MyD88 acts as a scaffold protein for the interaction between IRAK-1 and IRAK-4, allowing IRAK-4 to phosphorylate IRAK-1, leading to autophosphorylation and activation of IRAK-1 [1,2]. IRAK-4 is critical for IL-1R and TLR NF-κB and MAPK signaling pathways as well as TLR7/9 MyD88-mediated interferon activation.

== Role in disease ==
Interleukin 1 is a cytokine that acts locally and systemically in the innate immune system. IL-1a and IL-1ß are known for causing inflammation, but can also cause induction of other proinflammatory cytokines, and fever. Because IRAKs are a crucial step in the IL-1 receptor signalling pathway, deficiencies or over-expression of IRAKs can cause suboptimal or overactive cellular response to IL-1a and IL-1ß. Thus Interleukin-1 Receptor Associated Kinases are promising therapeutic targets for autoimmune-, immunodeficiency-, and cancer-related disorders.

=== Cancer ===
Inflammation signalling is known to be a major factor in many cancer types, and an inflammatory microclimate is a key aspect of human tumours. IL-1ß, which activates the inflammatory signalling pathway containing IRAKs, is directly involved in tumour cell growth, angiogenesis, invasion, and metastasis. In tumour cells containing the L265P MyD88 mutant, protein-signalling complexes spontaneously assemble, activating IRAK-4's kinase activity and promoting inflammation and growth independent of Interleukin-1 signalling. IRAK-4 inhibiting drugs are thus a potential therapeutic treatment for lymphoid malignancies with the L265P MyD88 mutation, especially in Waldenström's Macroglobulinaemia, in which BTK and IRAK1/4 inhibitors have shown promising but unconfirmed results.

In 2013, Garrett Rhyasen and his colleagues at the University of Cincinnati studied the contribution of active IRAK-1 and IRAK-4 in human myelodysplastic syndrome (MDS) and acute myeloid leukemia (AML). They found that IRAK1 knockout therapy incited apoptosis and impaired leukemic progenitor activity. They also established that IRAK4, while imperative to proliferation of human hematologic malignancies, is not imperative to the pathogenesis of MDS/AML. Further testing of IRAK-inhibitory therapy could prove essential to cancer therapy development.

=== Autoimmune Disorders ===
Autoimmune disorders such as MS, rheumatoid arthritis, lupus and psoriasis are caused by innate immune system deregulation inducing chronic inflammation. In most cases, inhibition of IRAK-1 and IRAK-4 are suspected to the most effective targets for knockout drugs, as their functions are integral to the cytokine pathways inducing chronic inflammation.

Mutations in the gene for IRAK-M have been identified as contributors to early onset asthma. Compromised IRAK-M leads to overproduction of inflammatory cytokines in the lungs, eventually triggering T cell mediated allergic reactions and exacerbation of asthma symptoms. Researchers have proposed that increasing IRAK-M function in these individuals may moderate asthma symptoms.
