= Inflammatory cytokine =

Type of signaling molecule

An inflammatory cytokine or proinflammatory cytokine is a type of signaling molecule (a cytokine) that is secreted from immune cells like helper T cells (T_{h}) and macrophages, and certain other cell types that promote inflammation. They include interleukin-1 (IL-1), IL-6, IL-12, and IL-18, tumor necrosis factor alpha (TNF-α), interferon gamma (IFNγ), and granulocyte-macrophage colony stimulating factor (GM-CSF) and play an important role in mediating the innate immune response. Inflammatory cytokines are predominantly produced by and involved in the upregulation of inflammatory reactions.

Excessive chronic production of inflammatory cytokines contribute to inflammatory diseases, that have been linked to different diseases, such as atherosclerosis and cancer. Dysregulation has also been linked to depression and other neurological diseases. A balance between proinflammatory and anti-inflammatory cytokines is necessary to maintain health. Aging and exercise also play a role in the amount of inflammation from the release of proinflammatory cytokines.

Therapies to treat inflammatory diseases include monoclonal antibodies that either neutralize inflammatory cytokines or their receptors.

== Definition ==
An inflammatory cytokine is a type of cytokine (a signaling molecule) that is secreted from immune cells and certain other cell types that promotes inflammation. Inflammatory cytokines are predominantly produced by T helper cells (T_{h}) and macrophages and involved in the upregulation of inflammatory reactions. Therapies to treat inflammatory diseases include monoclonal antibodies that either neutralize inflammatory cytokines or their receptors.

Inflammatory cytokines include interleukin-1 (IL-1), IL-12, and IL-18, tumor necrosis factor alpha (TNF-α), interferon gamma (IFNγ), and granulocyte-macrophage colony stimulating factor (GM-CSF).

== Function ==
Inflammatory cytokines play a role in initiating the inflammatory response and to regulate the host defence against pathogens mediating the innate immune response. Some inflammatory cytokines have additional roles such as acting as growth factors. Pro-inflammatory cytokines such as IL-1β, IL-6, and TNF-α also trigger pathological pain. While IL-1β is released by monocytes and macrophages, it is also present in nociceptive DRG neurons. IL-6 plays a role in neuronal reaction to an injury. TNF-α is a well known proinflammatory cytokine present in neurons and the glia. TNF-α is often involved in different signaling pathways to regulate apoptosis in the cells. Excessive chronic production of inflammatory cytokines contribute to inflammatory diseases. that have been linked to different diseases, such as atherosclerosis and cancer. Dysregulation of proinflammatory cytokines have also been linked to depression and other neurological diseases. A balance between proinflammatory and anti-inflammatory cytokines is necessary to maintain health. Aging and exercise also play a role in the amount of inflammation from the release of proinflammatory cytokines.

== Negative impacts ==
Due to its proinflammatory action, a proinflammatory cytokine tends to make the disease itself or the symptoms correlated to a disease worse by causing fever, inflammation, tissue destruction, and in some cases, even shock and death. Excessive amounts of proinflammatory cytokines have been shown to cause detrimental effects.

=== In the kidney ===
A proinflammatory cytokine affects functions of transporters and ion channels from the nephron. As a result, there is a change in the activity of the potassium ion (K+) channels that changes the transepithelial transport of solutes and water in the kidney. The kidney proximal tubule cells produce proinflammatory cytokines in response to lipopolysaccharide. Proinflammatory cytokines affect the renal K+ channels. IFNγ causes delayed suppression and acute stimulation of the 40 pS K+ channel. Also, transforming growth factor beta 1 (TGF-β1) activates the calcium-activated potassium channel (KCa3.1) which could be involved the detrimental effects of renal fibrosis.

=== Graft-vs-host disease ===
Graft-versus-host disease (GvHD) targets JAK 1 and 2, the human tyrosine kinase protein required for signaling in multiple cytokines. When these kinases are activated, signal proteins of the signal transducer and activator of transcription (STAT) protein family – which include transcription factors for target genes that serve proinflammatory roles – are phosphorylated. The severity of GvHD is highly variable and is influenced by the amount of native cells present in the environment along with other regulatory T cells, T_{H}1, T_{H}2, or T_{H}17 phenotypes. Both CD4^{+} and CD8 IL-17 producing T cells have been shown to cause aTH1, causing tissue inflammation and resulting in severe GVHD.

=== In cystic fibrosis ===
A proinflammatory cytokine causes hyperinflammation, the leading cause of lung tissue destruction in cystic fibrosis. With such a strong inflammatory response and an elevated number of immune cells, lungs of cystic fibrosis patients cannot clear the bacteria and become more susceptible to infections. A high prevalence (40-70%) of patients with cystic fibrosis show signs of asthma, possibly due to the primary deficiency in the cystic fibrosis transmembrane conductance regulator (CFTR). CFTR-deficient T-helper cells create an inflammatory environment that has high concentrations of TNF-α, IL-8, and IL-13, which contributes to increased contractility of airway smooth muscle.

=== In cardiovascular disease ===
Atherosclerosis induces a dysfunctional endothelium, which recruits immune cells that form lesions. Proinflammatory mediators cause inflammation after ligands in the heart vasculature activate immune cells. Recent studies have shown the ability of exercise to control oxidative stress and inflammation in cardiovascular disease.

=== In adipose tissue metabolism and obesity ===
A proinflammatory cytokine may be present in adipose tissues. Adipocytes generate TNF-α and other interleukins. Cytokines derived from adipose tissue serve as remote regulators such as hormones. Studies have shown that TNF-α and IL-6 concentrations are elevated in obesity. Obesity leaves an excess of nutrients for the body, thereby causing adipocytes to release more proinflammatory cytokines. Classically activated macrophages in the visceral fat accumulate in the fat tissues and continuously release proinflammatory cytokines, causing chronic inflammation in obese individuals.

=== In osteoarthritis ===
TNF-α, IL-1 and IL-6 have been found to play a pivotal role in cartilage matrix degradation and bone resorption in osteoarthritis. Animal studies indicate that inflammatory cytokines may stimulate chondrocytes to release cartilage-degrading protease in osteoarthritis. This finding does not, however, necessarily translate to Homo sapiens, as osteoarthritis in humans is considered to be more complex than any animal model.

=== Fatigue ===
Cytokines have key roles in inflammation, which is seen as a causal mechanism in fatigue.

== Clinical implications ==
Reducing the biological activity of proinflammatory cytokine can reduce the brunt of attack from diseases.

Blocking IL-1 or TNF-α has been highly successful in helping patients with rheumatoid arthritis, inflammatory bowel disease, or graft-vs-host disease (GvHD). However, the strategy has not yet been successful in humans with sepsis. Therapeutic effects of acupuncture may be related to the body's ability to suppress a range of proinflammatory cytokines such as tumor necrosis factor alpha (TNF-α), IL-1B, IL-6, and IL-10.

Estrogen has been shown to promote healing by decreasing the production of various proinflammatory cytokines like IL-6, TNF-α, and macrophage migration inhibitory factor (MIF). Increased MIF levels are often found at the site of chronic non-healing ulcers, with those levels dropping significantly with successful healing. A 2005 review of current experimental data shows that "estrogen regulates healing almost exclusively via MIF down-regulation and identifies novel MIF-regulated gene targets and clusters associated with aberrant healing." By down-regulating MIF, estrogen can promote healing, as correlated by clinical studies on aging skin and skin wounds. Unfortunately, estrogen-therapy has known carcinogenic effects as mentioned by the American Cancer Society (increased incidences of breast cancer in women who undergo HRT). However, scientists could make important discoveries in the future by studying "downstream effects on genes/factors that mediate the effects of estrogen on healing."

Histone deacetylate inhibitors (HDACi) can suppress proinflammatory cytokine production and reduce GvHD.

Some research also suggest an immunoregulatory effect of vitamin D, which has been shown to reduce the secretion of specific inflammatory cytokines.
