= YQ128 =

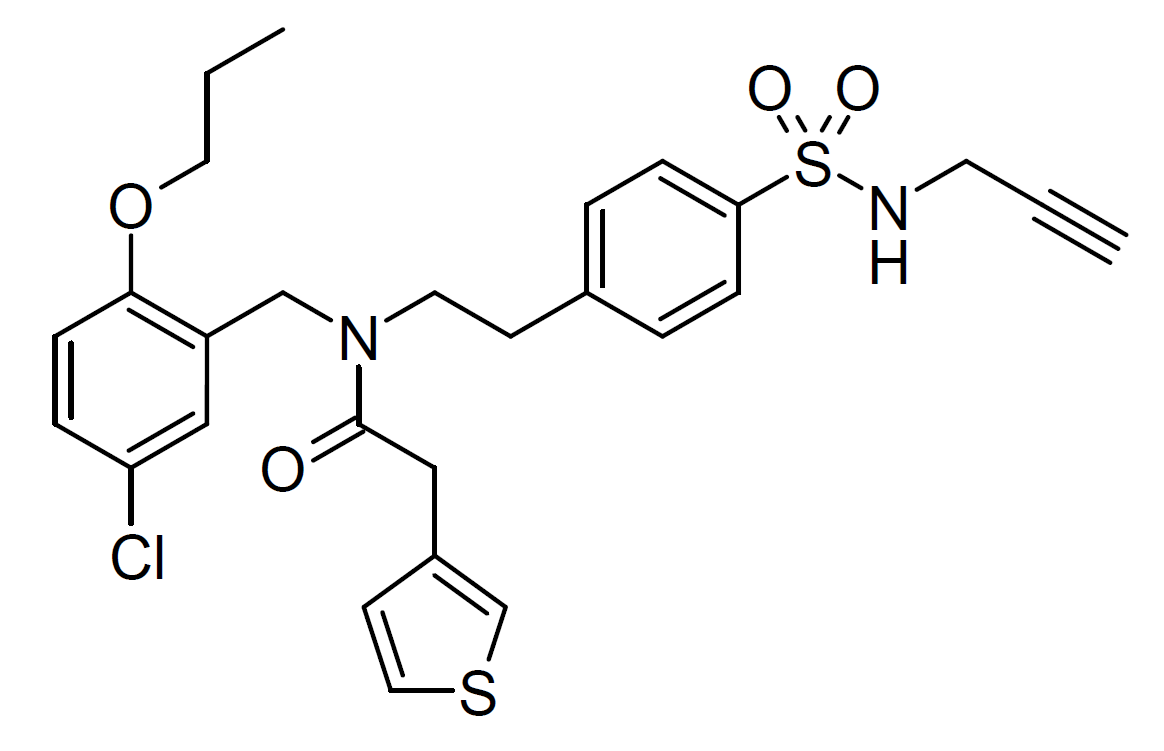

Identifiers
- IUPAC name: N-[(5-chloro-2-propoxyphenyl)methyl]-N-[2-[4-(prop-2-ynylsulfamoyl)phenyl]ethyl]-2-thiophen-3-ylacetamide
- CAS Number: 2454246-18-3
- PubChem CID: 139600339
- ChemSpider: 84442926
- ChEMBL: ChEMBL4559751

Chemical and physical data
- Formula: C_{27}H_{29}ClN_{2}O_{4}S_{2}
- Molar mass: 545.11 g·mol^{−1}
- 3D model (JSmol): Interactive image
- SMILES: CCCOC1=C(C=C(C=C1)Cl)CN(CCC2=CC=C(C=C2)S(=O)(=O)NCC#C)C(=O)CC3=CSC=C3
- InChI: InChI=1S/C27H29ClN2O4S2/c1-3-13-29-36(32,33)25-8-5-21(6-9-25)11-14-30(27(31)17-22-12-16-35-20-22)19-23-18-24(28)7-10-26(23)34-15-4-2/h1,5-10,12,16,18,20,29H,4,11,13-15,17,19H2,2H3; Key:SFPYRFRNYALLHS-UHFFFAOYSA-N

YQ128 is an experimental drug which acts as an inhibitor of the NLRP3 inflammasome. It inhibits the release of interleukin-1β and interleukin-18 which is usually triggered by inflammatory stimuli, and so terminates the resulting signalling cascade. It has antiinflammatory effects and good brain penetration, and is being researched for potential applications in conditions such as Alzheimer's disease and traumatic brain injury.

== See also ==
- NP3-146
