= CXCR1 =

Protein encoding gene found in humans

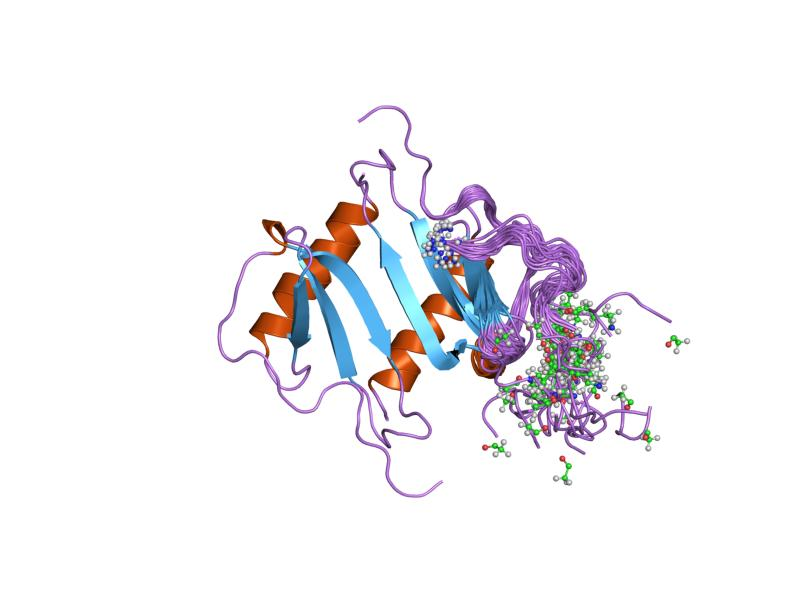

Identifiers
- Aliases: CXCR1, C-C, C-C-CKR-1, CD128, CD181, CDw128a, CKR-1, CMKAR1, IL8R1, IL8RA, IL8RBA, Interleukin 8 receptor, C-X-C motif chemokine receptor 1
- External IDs: OMIM: 146929; MGI: 2448715; GeneCards: CXCR1
Available structures
PDB	Ortholog search: PDBe RCSB
PDB	List of PDB id codes 1ILP, 1ILQ, 2LNL

Gene location (Human)
Chr.	Chromosome 2 (human)
Band	2q35	Start	218,162,841 bp
Band	2q35	End	218,166,962 bp

Gene location (Mouse)
Chr.	Chromosome 1 (mouse)
Band	1 C3|1 38.44 cM	Start	74,230,944 bp
Band	1 C3|1 38.44 cM	End	74,233,790 bp
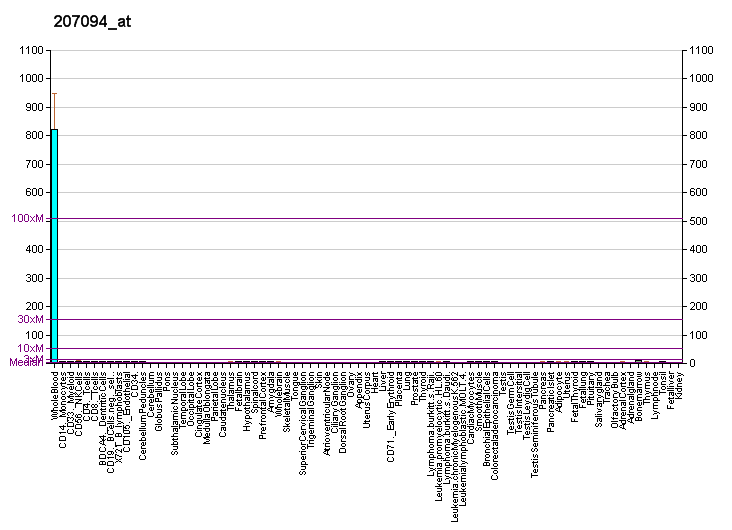
RNA expression pattern
Bgee	Human / Mouse (ortholog); Top expressed in: blood; granulocyte; periodontal fiber; spleen; bone marrow; bone marrow cell; appendix; right lung; upper lobe of left lung; nasal epithelium / Top expressed in: granulocyte; blastocyst; placenta; lung; zone of skin; More reference expression data
BioGPS	More reference expression data
Gene ontology
Molecular function	C-X-C chemokine receptor activity; interleukin-8 binding; G protein-coupled receptor activity; chemokine receptor activity; interleukin-8 receptor activity; signal transducer activity; C-C chemokine receptor activity; chemokine binding; C-C chemokine binding
Cellular component	integral component of membrane; plasma membrane; secretory granule membrane; membrane; external side of plasma membrane
Biological process	G protein-coupled receptor signaling pathway; cell surface receptor signaling pathway; receptor internalization; dendritic cell chemotaxis; signal transduction; chemokine-mediated signaling pathway; interleukin-8-mediated signaling pathway; neutrophil degranulation; chemotaxis; immune response; positive regulation of cytosolic calcium ion concentration; calcium-mediated signaling; neutrophil chemotaxis; cell chemotaxis
Sources:Amigo / QuickGO
Orthologs
Databases	NCBI: entry; OMA: entry
Species	Human	Mouse
Entrez	3577	227288
Ensembl	ENSG00000163464	ENSMUSG00000048480
UniProt	P25024	Q810W6
RefSeq (mRNA)	NM_000634	NM_178241
RefSeq (protein)	NP_000625	NP_839972
Location (UCSC)	Chr 2: 218.16 – 218.17 Mb	Chr 1: 74.23 – 74.23 Mb
PubMed search
- Wikidata
View/Edit Human	View/Edit Mouse

CXCR1 is a chemokine receptor that in humans is encoded by the CXCR1 gene. This gene has also been designated as CD181 (cluster of differentiation 181). The IUPHAR Committee on Receptor Nomenclature and Drug Classification use the HGNC recommended name, CXCR1.

== Function ==
The protein encoded by this gene is a member of the G-protein-coupled receptor family. This protein is a receptor for interleukin 8 (IL8). It binds to IL8 with high affinity, and transduces the signal through a G-protein-activated second messenger system. Knockout studies in mice suggested that this protein inhibits embryonic oligodendrocyte precursor migration in developing spinal cord. IL8RA, IL8RB, which encodes another high affinity IL8 receptor, and IL8RBP, a pseudogene of IL8RB, form a gene cluster in a region mapped to chromosome 2q33-q36. Stimulation of CXCR1 in neutrophils by its primary ligand, Interleukin 8, leads to neutrophil chemotaxis and activation.

== Clinical significance ==
Blocking CXCR1 (e.g., with repertaxin) inhibits some human breast cancer stem cells (in vitro and in mice).

In melanoma expression of CXCR1 at the cell surface is present, independent of the cancers stage. It is thought to have a role in the cell growth and angiogenesis required for tumour survival. In this way it has been identified as a potential therapeutic target.

CXCR1 can be cleaved and inactivated by Neutrophil Derived Serine Proteases (NSPs), leading to neutrophil dysfunction and impaired bacterial killing in cystic fibrosis lung disease.

== Interactions ==
Interleukin 8 receptor, alpha has been shown to interact with GNAI2.

== See also ==
- Interleukin
- Interleukin 8
- Interleukin 8 receptor, beta
- Interleukin receptor
- Interleukin-8 receptor
