= Interleukin-1 receptor family =

Immunoglobulin superfamily

Interleukin-1 receptor

Identifiers
- Symbol: Interleukin-1 receptor
- InterPro: IPR015621
- Membranome: 13
Available protein structures:
- PDB: IPR015621
- AlphaFold: IPR015621

Members of the very wide interleukin-1 receptor (IL-1R) family are characterized by extracellular immunoglobulin-like domains and intracellular Toll/Interleukin-1 receptor/Resistance protein (TIR) domain. It is a group of structurally homologous proteins, conserved throughout the species as it was identified from plants to mammals. Proteins of this family play important role in host defence, injury and stress. There are four main groups of TIR domain-containing proteins in animals; Toll-like receptors, Interleukin-1 receptor (IL-1R), cytosolic adaptor proteins (such as MyD88 adaptor protein) and insect and nematode Toll. Each of these groups is involved mainly in host defence; Toll receptors are also involved in embryogenesis.

== TIR domain ==
The TIR domain is about 200 amino acids long and consists of 3 conserved boxes and between these boxes there are regions of variable length. If due to some mutation all of the three boxes are damaged, there is no surface expression of the protein. If only boxes one and two are mutated, signalling activity is lost. There are also highly conserved regions between the three boxes as well. When the receptor is activated, the TIR domain recruits downstream cytoplasmic signalization adaptor proteins (such as Myd88 adaptor protein).

In addition to its traditional role as a scaffolding protein, the TIR domain can also possess intrinsic enzymatic activity to cleave the metabolite NAD^{+}, as first discovered in the protein SARM1. The ability of TIR domains to consume NAD^{+} is a primordial function of this protein domain, as many TIR domain-containing proteins from bacteria and archaea can degrade NAD^{+} into the products nicotinamide and ADP-ribose (ADPR) (or cyclic-ADPR).

== Immunoglobulin-like domain ==
Ig-like domain is the part of receptor which is located extracellularly. There are minimal homologies in amino acid sequences of Ig-like domains between proteins of IL-1R family but they all show characteristic Ig-fold and two β-sheets joined together by disulfide bonds which form between cysteine residues. There are differences in number of Ig-like domains between members of IL-1R family.

== IL-1R signalization ==
After ligand binding, the first step of IL-1R family signalling is oligomerization of TIR domains present on receptors (IL-1R, TLR), coreceptors (IL-1R accessory protein, CD14) and adaptor molecules (MyD88). TIR domain present on receptor creates a heterodimer with TIR domain on accessory protein. This high affinity receptor complex recruits downstream signalling molecules. The signal is transduced by cytoplasmatic kinases (such as IRAKs) and by other adaptors, such as tumor necrosis factor 6 (TRAF6). The final step of signalization is phosphorylation of the inhibitory molecule IkB by IkB kinase complex leading to transcription factor NF-κB releasing. NF-κB is translocated into nucleus and by binding DNA intermediates inflammatory, alergic and non-alergic immune response.

== Interleukin-1 receptor ==
The term interleukin-1 includes IL-1α, IL-1β and Interleukin 1 receptor antagonist (IL-1Ra). IL-1Rs are involved in immune host defence and hematopoiesis. IL-1R signalization activates immune response by activation of transcription of IL-1 target genes such as IL-6, IL-8, MCP-1, COX-2, IκBα, IL-1α, IL-1β, MKP-1. Components of signalization pathway of IL-1R which are involved in cellular response to IL-1 also mediate responses to other cytokines (IL-18 and IL-33), Toll-like receptors (TLRs), and many forms of cytotoxic stress. IL-1R functions as a bridge between adaptive and innate immunity.

=== Interleukin 1 receptor, type I ===
Type I IL-1R (IL-1RI), also known as CD121a, is receptor for IL-1α, IL-1β and IL-1RA. IL-1RI signalling is involved in thymocyte proliferation, B cells development, IL-2 and IL-6 production, stress responses, inflammatory responses, sleep regulation and appetite. IL-1RI signalling plays also important role in Th17 development. Studies of human autoimmune diseases such as sclerosis multiplex, Rheumatoid arthritis, psoriasis or autoimmune inflammatory bowel diseases show that defect in IL-1R1 signalling is responsible for Th17-mediated autoimmune diseases. IL-1R signalling is regulated by negative regulators such as inhibitory IL-R1 type II (IL-1RII), soluble IL-1RI and sIL-RII and IL-1Ra. It can be also regulated on the level of downstream signalling molecules by inhibiting recruitment of IRAKs, or by suppression of MyD88 secretion. IL-1R cooperates with receptor accessory protein and both are expressed on T cells, fibroblasts and endothelial cells.

=== Interleukin 1 receptor, type II ===
IL-1RII is predominantly expressed on lymphoid and myeloid cells including monocytes, neutrophils, bone marrow cells, macrophages and B cells, also on T cells and epithelial cells. There are three Ig-like domains located extracellulary and highly homological with IL-1RI. Intracellulary there are 24 amino acid long domains which lack the TIR domain thus it is unable to signal. IL-1RII is a surface receptor able to bind IL-1α, IL-1β and IL-1RI. It also forms a soluble form sIL-1RII. It is a decoy receptor – it inhibits activity of its ligands. Expression of IL-1RII is regulated by two different distal 5'UTRs and their associated promoter regions.

== IL-1 receptor accessory protein ==
IL-1RAcP is a second receptor subunit of IL-1RI. By forming a receptor heterodimer with IL-1RI facilitates signalization due to oligomerization of TIR domains of these proteins. IL-1RAcP does not bind IL-1 but it binds IL-1RI through its Ig-like domains 1 and 2 and is necessary for IL-1R1 signalling. In response to stress or acute phase induction, a soluble form of this protein is produced by alternative splicing.

== IL-1 receptor related protein 2 ==
IL 1 receptor-related protein 2 (IL-1R-rp2) consists of three Ig-like extracellular domains, transmembrane domain and cytoplasmic TIR domain. It was detected in lung, epithelium, brain vascular cells and in monocytes, keratinocytes, fibroblasts and endothelial cells. It activates NF-κB by binding IL-1ϵ.
