= Interleukin-18 receptor =

Interleukin receptor

interleukin 18 receptor 1

Identifiers
- Symbol: IL18R1
- Alt. symbols: IL1RRP, IL-1Rrp, CD218a
- NCBI gene: 8809
- HGNC: 5988
- OMIM: 604494
- RefSeq: NM_003855
- UniProt: Q13478

Other data
- Locus: Chr. 2 q12
Search for
- Structures: Swiss-model
- Domains: InterPro

interleukin 18 receptor accessory protein

Identifiers
- Symbol: IL18RAP
- Alt. symbols: AcPL, CD218b
- NCBI gene: 8807
- HGNC: 5989
- OMIM: 604509
- RefSeq: NM_003853
- UniProt: O95256

Other data
- Locus: Chr. 2 p24.3-24.1
Search for
- Structures: Swiss-model
- Domains: InterPro

The interleukin-18 receptor (IL-18R) is an interleukin receptor of the immunoglobulin superfamily.

Endometrial IL-18 receptor mRNA and the ratio of IL-18 binding protein to interleukin 18 are significantly increased in adenomyosis patients in comparison to normal people, indicating a role in its pathogenesis.
