= IL18R1 =

Protein-coding gene in the species Homo sapiens

Identifiers
- Aliases: IL18R1, CD218a, CDw218a, IL-1Rrp, IL18RA, IL1RRP, interleukin 18 receptor 1, IL-18R-alpha, IL18Ralpha2, IL-18Ralpha
- External IDs: OMIM: 604494; MGI: 105383; GeneCards: IL18R1
Available structures
PDB	Ortholog search: PDBe RCSB
PDB	List of PDB id codes 3WO3, 3WO4, 4R6U
Enzyme activity
EC #	BRENDA	ExPASy	KEGG	MetaCyc
3.2.2.6	↗	↗	↗	↗

Gene location (Human)
Chr.	Chromosome 2 (human)
Band	2q12.1	Start	102,311,529 bp
Band	2q12.1	End	102,398,777 bp

Gene location (Mouse)
Chr.	Chromosome 1 (mouse)
Band	1|1 B	Start	40,504,712 bp
Band	1|1 B	End	40,540,014 bp
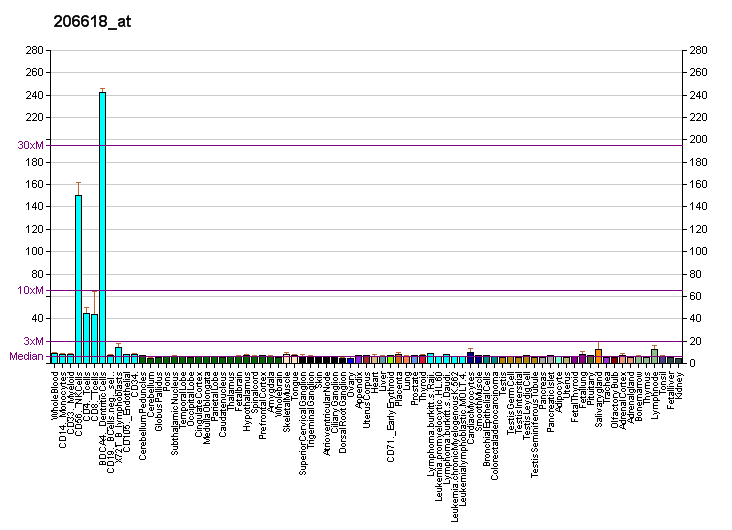
RNA expression pattern
Bgee	Human / Mouse (ortholog); Top expressed in: right lung; upper lobe of left lung; testicle; blood; granulocyte; spleen; appendix; gallbladder; right lobe of liver; left uterine tube / Top expressed in: right lung lobe; left lung; conjunctival fornix; granulocyte; left lung lobe; blood; transitional epithelium of urinary bladder; mesenteric lymph nodes; spleen; pharynx; More reference expression data
BioGPS	More reference expression data
Gene ontology
Molecular function	interleukin-18 receptor activity; protein binding; interleukin-1 receptor activity; signaling receptor activity; interleukin-18 binding
Cellular component	integral component of membrane; plasma membrane; membrane; interleukin-18 receptor complex
Biological process	natural killer cell activation; positive regulation of interferon-gamma production; T-helper 1 cell differentiation; immune response; signal transduction; interleukin-18-mediated signaling pathway; cellular response to cytokine stimulus; positive regulation of NIK/NF-kappaB signaling; positive regulation of NF-kappaB transcription factor activity; positive regulation of T-helper 1 cell cytokine production; inflammatory response; negative regulation of cold-induced thermogenesis
Sources:Amigo / QuickGO
Orthologs
Databases	NCBI: entry; OMA: entry
Species	Human	Mouse
Entrez	8809	16182
Ensembl	ENSG00000115604	ENSMUSG00000026070
UniProt	Q13478	Q61098
RefSeq (mRNA)	NM_001282399; NM_003855; NM_001371418; NM_001371419; NM_001371420 NM_001371421; NM_001371422; NM_001371423; NM_001371424	NM_001161842; NM_001161843; NM_008365
RefSeq (protein)	NP_001269328; NP_003846; NP_001358347; NP_001358348; NP_001358349 NP_001358350; NP_001358351; NP_001358352; NP_001358353	NP_001155314; NP_001155315; NP_032391
Location (UCSC)	Chr 2: 102.31 – 102.4 Mb	Chr 1: 40.5 – 40.54 Mb
PubMed search
- Wikidata
View/Edit Human	View/Edit Mouse

The interleukin-18 receptor 1 (IL-18R1) is an interleukin receptor of the immunoglobulin superfamily. IL18R1 is its human gene. IL18R1 is also known as CDw218a (cluster of differentiation w218a).

The protein encoded by this gene is a cytokine receptor that belongs to the interleukin 1 receptor family. This receptor specifically binds interleukin 18 (IL18), and is essential for IL18 mediated signal transduction. IFN-alpha and IL12 are reported to induce the expression of this receptor in NK and T cells. This gene along with four other members of the interleukin 1 receptor family, including IL1R2, IL1R1, ILRL2 (IL-1Rrp2), and IL1RL1 (T1/ST2), form a gene cluster on chromosome 2q.

== See also ==
- Interleukin-18 receptor
