= Interleukin receptor =

Cell surface proteins

Identifiers
- Symbol: Interleukin receptor
- Membranome: 1311

Interleukin receptors are a family of cytokine receptors for interleukins. They belong to the immunoglobulin superfamily.

== Types ==
There are two main families of Interleukin receptors, Type 1 and Type 2.

=== Type 1 ===
Type 1 interleukin receptors include:

- Interleukin-1 receptor
- Interleukin-2 receptor
- Interleukin-3 receptor
- Interleukin-4 receptor
- Interleukin-5 receptor
- Interleukin-6 receptor
- Interleukin-7 receptor
- Interleukin-9 receptor
- Interleukin-11 receptor
- Interleukin-12 receptor
- Interleukin-13 receptor
- Interleukin-15 receptor
- Interleukin-18 receptor
- Interleukin-21 receptor
- Interleukin-23 receptor
- Interleukin-27 receptor

=== Type 2 ===
Type 2 interleukin receptors are Type II cytokine receptors. They include:

- Interleukin-10 receptor
- Interleukin-20 receptor
- Interleukin-22 receptor
- Interleukin-28 receptor

=== Other ===
- Interleukin-8 receptor, RANTES receptors (CCR1, CCR3, CCR5), MIP-1 receptor, PF4 receptor, M-CSF receptor and NAP-2 receptor belong to GPCR chemokine receptor family.
