= Interleukin 18 =

Protein-coding gene in the species Homo sapiens

IL18
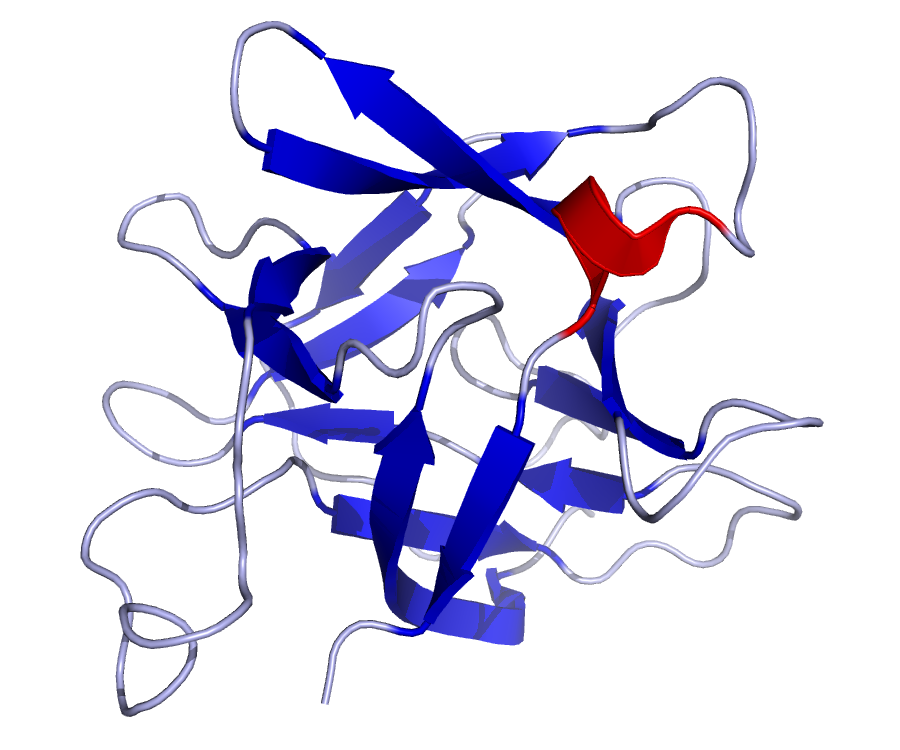

Identifiers
- Aliases: IL18, IGIF, IL-18, IL-1g, IL1F4, interleukin 18
- External IDs: OMIM: 600953; MGI: 107936; GeneCards: IL18
Available structures
PDB	Ortholog search: PDBe RCSB
PDB	List of PDB id codes 1J0S, 2VXT, 3F62, 4EEE, 4EKX, 4HJJ, 3WO2, 3WO3, 3WO4, 4R6U, 4XFS, 4XFT, 4XFU

Gene location (Human)
Chr.	Chromosome 11 (human)
Band	11q23.1	Start	112,143,253 bp
Band	11q23.1	End	112,164,096 bp

Gene location (Mouse)
Chr.	Chromosome 9 (mouse)
Band	9 A5.3|9 27.75 cM	Start	50,466,127 bp
Band	9 A5.3|9 27.75 cM	End	50,493,140 bp
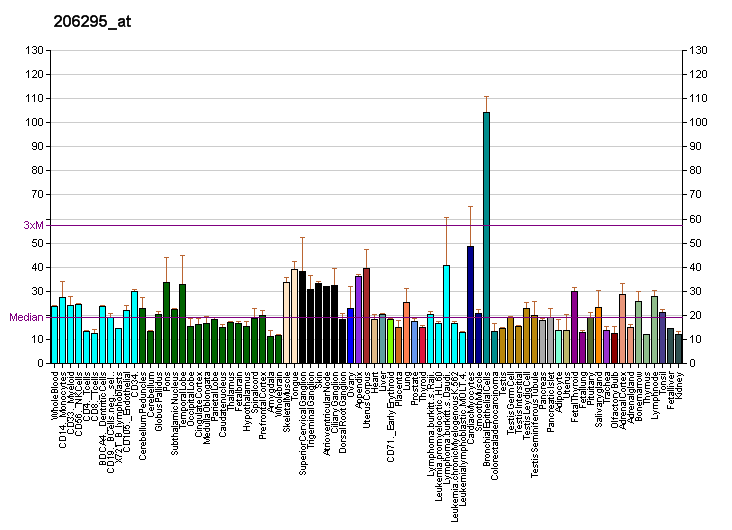
RNA expression pattern
Bgee	Human / Mouse (ortholog); Top expressed in: skin of abdomen; skin of leg; rectum; skin of thigh; gallbladder; mucosa of transverse colon; olfactory zone of nasal mucosa; germinal epithelium; human penis; oral cavity / Top expressed in: epithelium of stomach; pyloric antrum; mucous cell of stomach; left colon; skin of external ear; esophagus; duodenum; jejunum; spleen; lip; More reference expression data
BioGPS	More reference expression data
Gene ontology
Molecular function	protein binding; cytokine activity; interleukin-18 receptor binding
Cellular component	cytosol; extracellular region; extracellular space
Biological process	positive regulation of inflammatory response; cell-cell signaling; cellular response to organic cyclic compound; type 2 immune response; MAPK cascade; positive regulation of natural killer cell proliferation; sleep; regulation of cell adhesion; positive regulation of NK T cell proliferation; positive regulation of granulocyte macrophage colony-stimulating factor production; positive regulation of tissue remodeling; angiogenesis; T-helper 1 type immune response; positive regulation of interleukin-17 production; inflammatory response; lipopolysaccharide-mediated signaling pathway; positive regulation of activated T cell proliferation; positive regulation of protein kinase B signaling; positive regulation of phosphatidylinositol 3-kinase signaling; positive regulation of smooth muscle cell proliferation; activation of protein kinase B activity; positive regulation of transcription by RNA polymerase II; positive regulation of tyrosine phosphorylation of STAT protein; positive regulation of gene expression; positive regulation of macrophage derived foam cell differentiation; natural killer cell activation; positive regulation of interferon-gamma production; cholesterol homeostasis; positive regulation of T-helper 2 cell differentiation; negative regulation of myoblast differentiation; triglyceride homeostasis; cell population proliferation; regulation of signaling receptor activity; interleukin-6 production; T-helper 1 cell cytokine production; neutrophil activation; natural killer cell mediated cytotoxicity; cytokine-mediated signaling pathway; interleukin-18-mediated signaling pathway; positive regulation of NIK/NF-kappaB signaling; immune response; positive regulation of NF-kappaB transcription factor activity; positive regulation of T-helper 1 cell cytokine production; positive regulation of cold-induced thermogenesis; positive regulation of neuroinflammatory response; signal transduction
Sources:Amigo / QuickGO
Orthologs
Databases	NCBI: entry; OMA: entry
Species	Human	Mouse
Entrez	3606	16173
Ensembl	ENSG00000150782	ENSMUSG00000039217
UniProt	Q14116	P70380
RefSeq (mRNA)	NM_001243211; NM_001562; NM_001386420	NM_008360; NM_001357221; NM_001357222
RefSeq (protein)	NP_001230140; NP_001553; NP_001230140.1	NP_032386; NP_001344150; NP_001344151
Location (UCSC)	Chr 11: 112.14 – 112.16 Mb	Chr 9: 50.47 – 50.49 Mb
PubMed search
- Wikidata
View/Edit Human	View/Edit Mouse

Interleukin-18 (IL-18), also known as interferon-gamma inducing factor, is a protein which in humans is encoded by the IL18 gene. The protein encoded by this gene is a proinflammatory cytokine. Many cell types, both hematopoietic cells and non-hematopoietic cells, have the potential to produce IL-18. It was first described in 1989 as a factor that induced interferon-γ (IFN-γ) production in mouse spleen cells. Originally, IL-18 production was recognized in Kupffer cells, and liver-resident macrophages. However, IL-18 is constitutively expressed in non-hematopoietic cells, such as intestinal epithelial cells, keratinocytes, and endothelial cells. IL-18 can modulate both innate and adaptive immunity and its dysregulation can cause autoimmune or inflammatory diseases.

== Processing ==
Cytokines usually contain the signal peptide which is necessary for their extracellular release. However, the IL-18 protein, similar to other IL-1 family members, lacks this signal peptide. Furthermore, similar to IL-1β, IL-18 is produced as a biologically inactive precursor. IL-18 gene encodes for a 193 amino acids precursor, first synthesized as an inactive 24 kDa precursor with no signal peptide, which accumulates in the cell cytoplasm. Similarly to IL-1β, the IL-18 precursor is processed intracellularly by caspase 1 in the NLRP3 inflammasome into its mature biologically active molecule of 18 kDa.

== Receptor and signaling ==
IL-18 receptor consists of the inducible component IL-18Rα, which binds the mature IL-18 with low affinity and the constitutively expressed co-receptor IL-18Rβ. IL-18 binds the ligand receptor IL-18Rα, inducing the recruitment of IL-18Rβ to form a high affinity complex, which signals through the toll/interleukin-1 receptor (TIR) domain. This signaling domain recruits the MyD88 adaptor protein that activates proinflammatory programs and NF-κB pathway. The activity of IL-18 can be suppressed by extracellular interleukin 18 binding protein (IL-18BP) that binds soluble IL-18 with a higher affinity than IL-18Rα thus preventing IL-18 binding to IL-18 receptor. IL-37 is another endogenous factor that suppresses the action of IL-18. IL-37 has high homology with IL-18 and can bind to IL-18Rα, which then forms a complex with IL-18BP, thereby reducing the activity of IL-18. Moreover, IL-37 binds to single immunoglobulin IL-1 receptor related protein (SIGIRR), also known as IL-1R8 or TIR8, which forms a complex with IL-18Rα and induces an anti-inflammatory response. The IL-37/IL-18Rα/IL-1R8 complex activates the STAT3 signaling pathway, decreases NF-κB and AP-1 activation and reduces IFNγ production. Thus, IL-37 and IL-18 have opposing roles and IL-37 can modulate pro-inflammatory effects of IL-18.

== Function ==
IL-18 belongs to the IL-1 superfamily and is produced mainly by macrophages but also by other cell types, stimulates various cell types and has pleiotropic functions. IL-18 is a proinflammatory cytokine that facilitates type 1 responses. Together with IL-12, it induces cell-mediated immunity following infection with microbial products like lipopolysaccharide (LPS). IL-18 in combination with IL-12 acts on CD4, CD8 T cells and NK cells to induce IFNγ production, a type II interferon that plays an important role in activating macrophages and other cells. The combination of IL-18 and IL-12 has been shown to inhibit IL-4 dependent IgE and IgG1 production and enhance IgG2a production in B cells. Importantly, without IL-12 or IL-15, IL-18 does not induce IFNγ production, but plays an important role in the differentiation of naive T cells into Th2 cells and stimulates mast cells and basophils to produce IL-4, IL-13, and chemical mediators such as histamine.

== Clinical significance ==
Apart from its physiological role, IL-18 is also able to induce severe inflammatory reactions, which suggests its role in certain inflammatory disorders such as chronic inflammation and autoimmune disorders. High levels of IL18 have also been described in essential hypertensive subjects

Endometrial IL-18 receptor mRNA and the ratio of IL-18 binding protein to interleukin 18 is significantly increased in adenomyosis patients in comparison to normal people, indicating a role in its pathogenesis.

IL-18 has been implicated as an inflammatory mediator of Hashimoto's thyroiditis, the most common cause of autoimmune hypothyroidism. IL-18 is upregulated by interferon-gamma.

IL-18 has also been found to increase the Alzheimer's disease-associated amyloid-beta production in human neuron cells.

IL-18 is also associated with urine protein excretion which means that it can be marker for assessing the progression of diabetic nephropathy. This interleukin was also significantly elevated in patients with microalbuminuria and macroalbuminuria when it was compared with healthy people and patients with diabetes which have normoalbuminuria.

IL-18 is involved in the neuroinflammatory response after intracerebral hemorrhage.

The single-nucleotide polymorphism (SNP) IL18 rs360719, a genetic variant of the Interleukin-18 (IL-18) gene, revealed a probable role in determining the susceptibility to systemic lupus erythematosus and to be a possible "key factor in the expression of the IL18 gene."
