= CXCR2 =

Protein encoding gene in humans

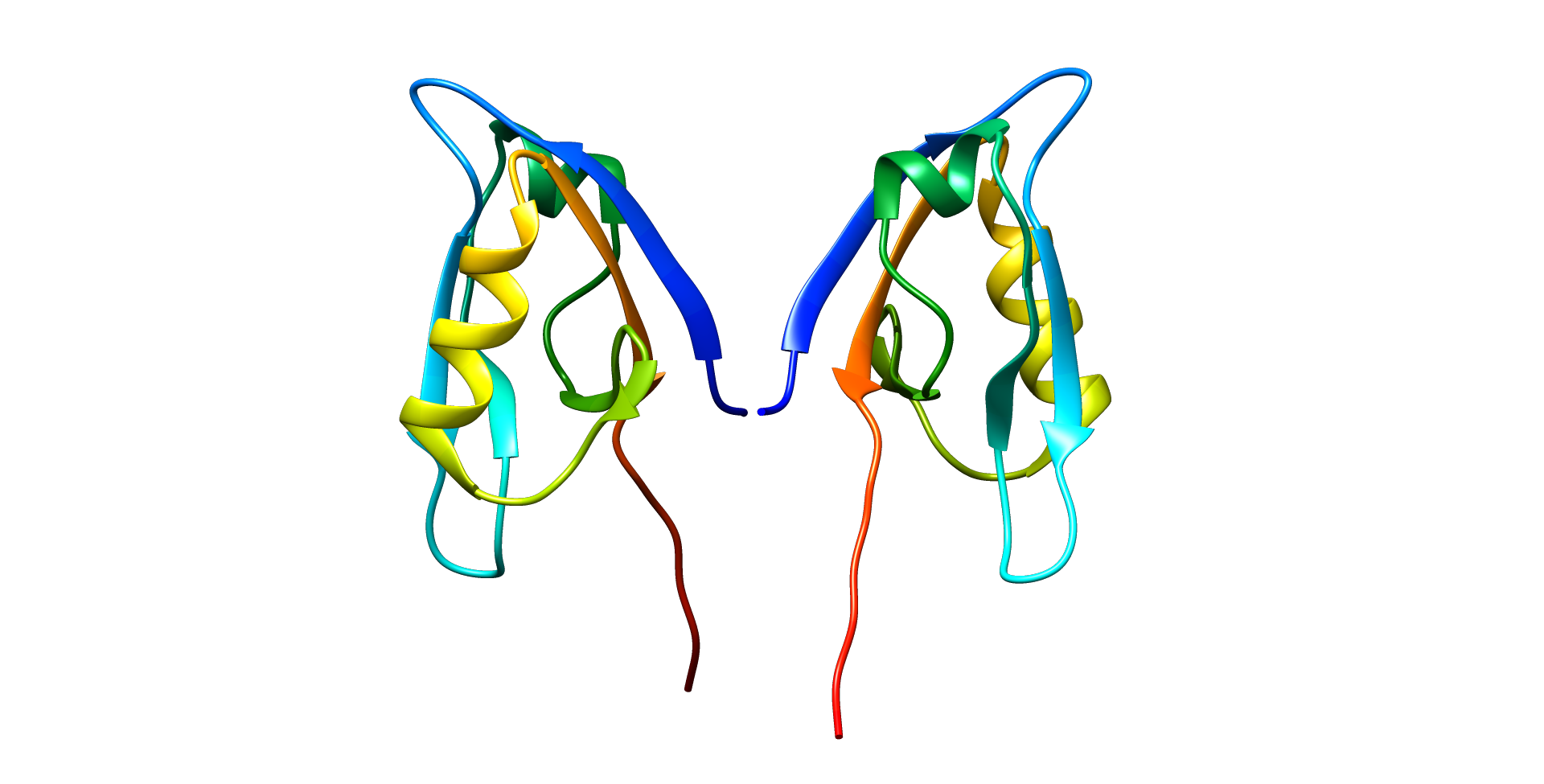

Identifiers
- Aliases: CXCR2, CD182, CDw128b, CMKAR2, IL8R2, IL8RA, IL8RB, Interleukin 8 receptor, beta, C-X-C motif chemokine receptor 2, WHIMS2
- External IDs: OMIM: 146928; MGI: 105303; GeneCards: CXCR2
Available structures
PDB	Ortholog search: PDBe RCSB
PDB	List of PDB id codes 4Q3H

Gene location (Human)
Chr.	Chromosome 2 (human)
Band	2q35	Start	218,125,289 bp
Band	2q35	End	218,137,251 bp

Gene location (Mouse)
Chr.	Chromosome 1 (mouse)
Band	1 C3|1 38.41 cM	Start	74,193,148 bp
Band	1 C3|1 38.41 cM	End	74,200,405 bp
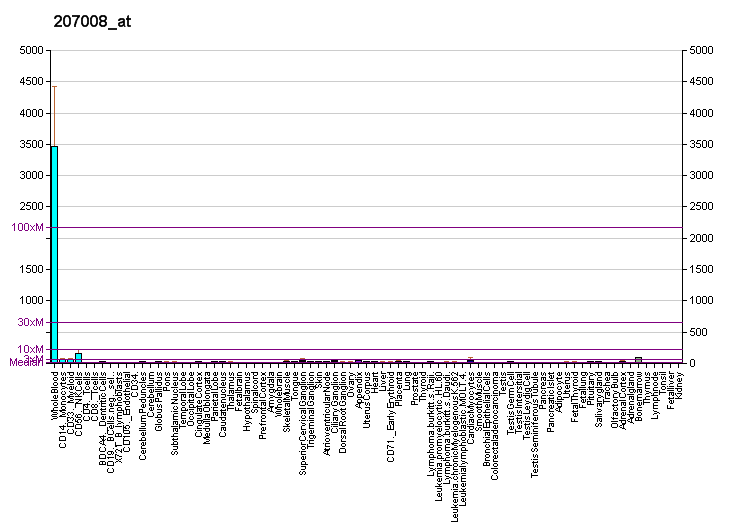
RNA expression pattern
Bgee	Human / Mouse (ortholog); Top expressed in: blood; periodontal fiber; granulocyte; trabecular bone; epithelium of esophagus; monocyte; gonad; spleen; oral cavity; bone marrow / Top expressed in: granulocyte; placenta; bone marrow; esophagus; embryo; spleen; embryo; blastocyst; lip; lung; More reference expression data
BioGPS	More reference expression data
Gene ontology
Molecular function	C-X-C chemokine receptor activity; interleukin-8 binding; protein binding; interleukin-8 receptor activity; chemokine receptor activity; signal transducer activity; G protein-coupled receptor activity; C-C chemokine receptor activity; chemokine binding; C-C chemokine binding
Cellular component	integral component of membrane; membrane; mast cell granule; plasma membrane; integral component of plasma membrane; intracellular anatomical structure; cell surface; secretory granule membrane; external side of plasma membrane
Biological process	neutrophil activation; receptor internalization; dendritic cell chemotaxis; chemotaxis; cellular defense response; phospholipase C-activating G protein-coupled receptor signaling pathway; cell surface receptor signaling pathway; positive regulation of cell population proliferation; inflammatory response; chemokine-mediated signaling pathway; neutrophil degranulation; G protein-coupled receptor signaling pathway; acute inflammatory response to antigenic stimulus; positive regulation of leukocyte chemotaxis; positive regulation of cytosolic calcium ion concentration; positive regulation of cardiac muscle cell apoptotic process; neutrophil chemotaxis; midbrain development; negative regulation of neutrophil apoptotic process; negative regulation of apoptotic process; positive regulation of vascular permeability; positive regulation of angiogenesis; metanephric tubule morphogenesis; positive regulation of neutrophil chemotaxis; signal transduction; interleukin-8-mediated signaling pathway; immune response; calcium-mediated signaling; cell chemotaxis
Sources:Amigo / QuickGO
Orthologs
Databases	NCBI: entry; OMA: entry
Species	Human	Mouse
Entrez	3579	12765
Ensembl	ENSG00000180871	ENSMUSG00000026180
UniProt	P25025	P35343
RefSeq (mRNA)	NM_001168298; NM_001557	NM_009909
RefSeq (protein)	NP_001161770; NP_001548	NP_034039
Location (UCSC)	Chr 2: 218.13 – 218.14 Mb	Chr 1: 74.19 – 74.2 Mb
PubMed search
- Wikidata
View/Edit Human	View/Edit Mouse

CXCR2 is a chemokine receptor that in humans is encoded by the CXCR2 gene.

== Function ==
The protein encoded by this gene is a member of the G-protein-coupled receptor family. This protein is a receptor for interleukin 8 (IL8). It binds to IL8 with high affinity, and transduces the signal through a G-protein-activated second messenger system (G_{i/o}-coupled). This receptor also binds to chemokine (C-X-C motif) ligand 1 (CXCL1/MGSA), a protein with melanoma growth stimulating activity, and has been shown to be a major component required for serum-dependent melanoma cell growth. In addition, it binds ligands CXCL2, CXCL3, and CXCL5.

The angiogenic effects of IL8 in intestinal microvascular endothelial cells are found to be mediated by this receptor. Knockout studies in mice suggested that this receptor controls the positioning of oligodendrocyte precursors in developing spinal cord by arresting their migration. IL8RB, IL8RA, which encodes another high affinity IL8 receptor, and IL8RBP, a pseudogene of IL8RB, form a gene cluster in a region mapped to chromosome 2q33-q36.

Mutations in CXCR2 cause hematological traits.

== Senescence ==
Knock-down studies involving the chemokine receptor CXCR2 alleviates both replicative and oncogene-induced senescence (OIS) and diminishes the DNA-damage response. Also, ectopic expression of CXCR2 results in premature senescence via a p53-dependent mechanism.

== See also ==
- Interleukin 8 receptor, alpha
- Interleukin 8
- Interleukin
- Interleukin receptor
- Cluster of differentiation
- G protein-coupled receptor
