= IL18BP =

Protein-coding gene in the species Homo sapiens

Identifiers
- Aliases: IL18BP, IL18BPa, interleukin 18 binding protein, FVH
- External IDs: OMIM: 604113; MGI: 1333800; GeneCards: IL18BP

Gene location (Human)
Chr.	Chromosome 11 (human)
Band	11q13.4	Start	71,998,613 bp
Band	11q13.4	End	72,005,715 bp

Gene location (Mouse)
Chr.	Chromosome 7 (mouse)
Band	7|7 E2	Start	101,664,092 bp
Band	7|7 E2	End	101,667,897 bp
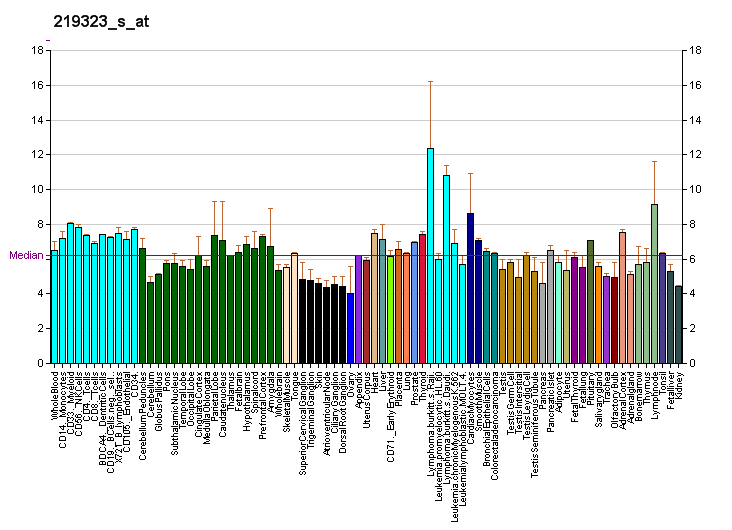
RNA expression pattern
Bgee	Human / Mouse (ortholog); Top expressed in: spleen; upper lobe of left lung; granulocyte; mucosa of ileum; apex of heart; lymph node; right adrenal gland; left adrenal cortex; right lung; right adrenal cortex / Top expressed in: granulocyte; mesenteric lymph nodes; seminal vesicula; thymus; mucous cell of stomach; tail of embryo; liver; stroma of bone marrow; genital tubercle; fetal liver hematopoietic progenitor cell; More reference expression data
BioGPS	More reference expression data
Gene ontology
Molecular function	receptor antagonist activity; interleukin-18 binding
Cellular component	extracellular region; extracellular exosome; extracellular space
Biological process	T-helper 1 type immune response; cellular response to tumor necrosis factor; response to lipopolysaccharide; cellular response to hydrogen peroxide; extracellular negative regulation of signal transduction; interleukin-18-mediated signaling pathway; cellular response to cytokine stimulus; negative regulation of signaling receptor activity
Sources:Amigo / QuickGO
Orthologs
Databases	NCBI: entry; OMA: entry
Species	Human	Mouse
Entrez	10068	16068
Ensembl	ENSG00000137496	ENSMUSG00000070427
UniProt	O95998	Q9Z0M9
RefSeq (mRNA)	NM_001039659; NM_001039660; NM_001145055; NM_001145057; NM_005699 NM_173042; NM_173043; NM_173044	NM_010531; NM_001363982; NM_001382458
RefSeq (protein)	NP_001034748; NP_001034749; NP_001138527; NP_001138529; NP_005690 NP_766630; NP_766632; NP_766632.2	NP_034661; NP_001350911; NP_001369387
Location (UCSC)	Chr 11: 72 – 72.01 Mb	Chr 7: 101.66 – 101.67 Mb
PubMed search
- Wikidata
View/Edit Human	View/Edit Mouse

Interleukin-18-binding protein is a protein that in humans is encoded by the IL18BP gene.

The protein encoded by this gene is an inhibitor of the proinflammatory cytokine IL18. This protein binds to IL18, prevents the binding of IL18 to its receptor, and thus inhibits IL18-induced IFN-gamma production. This protein is constitutively expressed and secreted in mononuclear cells. The expression of this protein can be enhanced by IFN-gamma. An elevated level of this protein is detected in the intestinal tissues of patients with Crohn's disease. Three transcript variants encoding the same protein have been found for this gene.
