= Interleukin 8 =

Mammalian protein found in humans

CXCL8
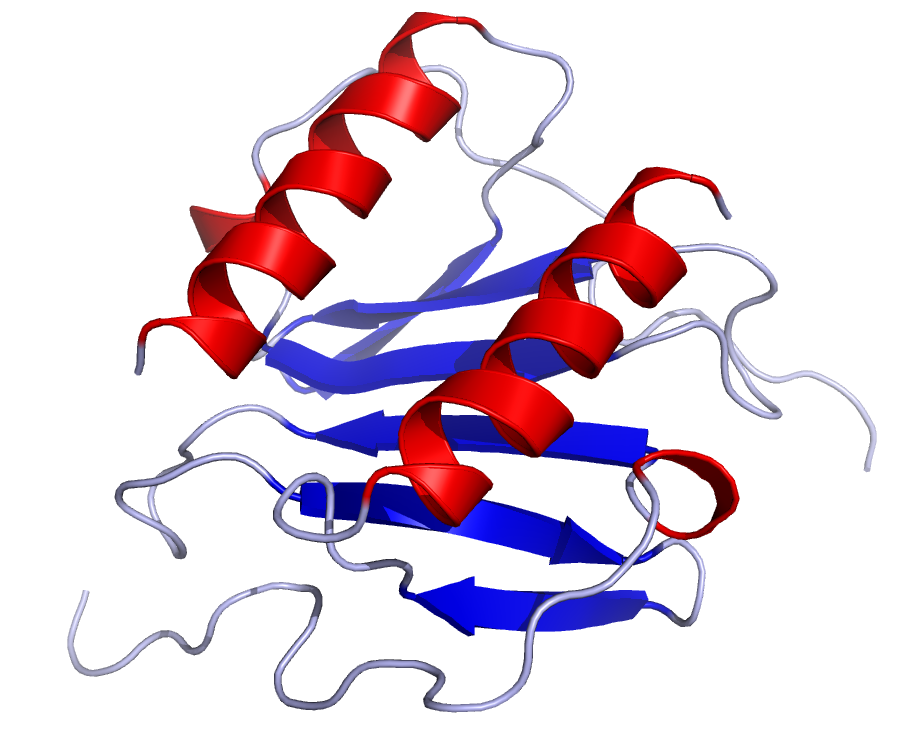

Identifiers
- Aliases: CXCL8, chemokine (C-X-C motif) ligand 8, GCP-1, GCP1, LECT, LUCT, LYNAP, MDNCF, MONAP, NAF, NAP-1, NAP1, IL8, C-X-C motif chemokine ligand 8, Interleukin-8, SCYB8
- External IDs: OMIM: 146930; GeneCards: CXCL8
Available structures
PDB	Human UniProt search: PDBe RCSB
PDB	List of PDB id codes 3IL8, 1ICW, 1IKL, 1IKM, 1IL8, 1ILP, 1ILQ, 1QE6, 1ROD, 2IL8, 4XDX

Gene location (Human)
Chr.	Chromosome 4 (human)
Band	4q13.3	Start	73,740,519 bp
Band	4q13.3	End	73,743,716 bp
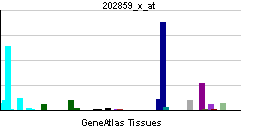

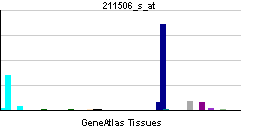
RNA expression pattern
Bgee	Human / Mouse (ortholog); Top expressed in: periodontal fiber; granulocyte; beta cell; cartilage tissue; olfactory zone of nasal mucosa; monocyte; mucosa of paranasal sinus; bone marrow cell; sperm; gallbladder / n/a; More reference expression data
BioGPS	More reference expression data
Gene ontology
Molecular function	cytokine activity; protein binding; interleukin-8 receptor binding; chemokine activity
Cellular component	extracellular region; intracellular anatomical structure; extracellular space
Biological process	G protein-coupled receptor signaling pathway; intracellular signal transduction; chemokine-mediated signaling pathway; cellular response to tumor necrosis factor; receptor internalization; cellular response to fibroblast growth factor stimulus; response to endoplasmic reticulum stress; positive regulation of angiogenesis; regulation of single stranded viral RNA replication via double stranded DNA intermediate; PERK-mediated unfolded protein response; induction of positive chemotaxis; chemotaxis; regulation of cell adhesion; immune response; cellular response to interleukin-1; angiogenesis; positive regulation of neutrophil chemotaxis; inflammatory response; negative regulation of G protein-coupled receptor signaling pathway; response to molecule of bacterial origin; cellular response to lipopolysaccharide; embryonic digestive tract development; signal transduction; negative regulation of cell population proliferation; calcium-mediated signaling; regulation of entry of bacterium into host cell; defense response; neutrophil chemotaxis; neutrophil activation; antimicrobial humoral immune response mediated by antimicrobial peptide; regulation of signaling receptor activity; cytokine-mediated signaling pathway; leukocyte chemotaxis
Sources:Amigo / QuickGO
Orthologs
Databases	NCBI: entry; OMA: entry
Species	Human	Mouse
Entrez	3576	n/a
Ensembl	ENSG00000169429	n/a
UniProt	P10145	n/a
RefSeq (mRNA)	NM_000584; NM_001354840	n/a
RefSeq (protein)	NP_000575; NP_001341769	n/a
Location (UCSC)	Chr 4: 73.74 – 73.74 Mb	n/a
PubMed search		n/a
- Wikidata
View/Edit Human

Interleukin 8 (IL-8 or chemokine (C-X-C motif) ligand 8, CXCL8) is a chemokine produced by macrophages and other cell types such as epithelial cells, airway smooth muscle cells and endothelial cells. Endothelial cells store IL-8 in their storage vesicles, the Weibel–Palade bodies. In humans, the interleukin-8 protein is encoded by the CXCL8 gene. IL-8 is initially produced as a precursor peptide of 99 amino acids which then undergoes cleavage to create several active IL-8 isoforms. In culture, a 72 amino acid peptide is the major form secreted by macrophages.

There are many receptors on the surface membrane capable of binding IL-8; the most frequently studied types are the G protein-coupled serpentine receptors CXCR1 and CXCR2. Expression and affinity for IL-8 differs between the two receptors (CXCR1 > CXCR2). Through a chain of biochemical reactions, IL-8 is secreted and is an important mediator of the immune reaction in the innate immune system response.

== Function ==
IL-8, also known as monocyte-derived neutrophil chemotactic factor (MDNCF), has two primary functions. It induces chemotaxis in target cells, primarily neutrophils but also other granulocytes, causing them to migrate toward the site of infection. IL-8 also stimulates phagocytosis once they have arrived. IL-8 is also known to be a potent promoter of angiogenesis. In target cells, IL-8 induces a series of physiological responses required for migration and phagocytosis, such as increases in intracellular Ca^{2+}, exocytosis (e.g. histamine release), and the respiratory burst.

IL-8 can be secreted by any cells with toll-like receptors that are involved in the innate immune response and has been demonstrated to be a signatory chemokine of CR2+ naive T cells, also known as recent thymic emigrants. Usually, it is the macrophages that see an antigen first, and thus are the first cells to release IL-8 to recruit other cells. Both monomer and homodimer forms of IL-8 have been reported to be potent inducers of the chemokine receptors CXCR1 and CXCR2. The homodimer is more potent, but methylation of Leu25 can block the activity of homodimers. IL-8 is a member of the CXC chemokine family. The genes encoding this and the other ten members of the CXC chemokine family form a cluster in a region mapped to chromosome 4q.

Another key function of the cell signalling stimulated by IL-8, is the initiation of the oxidative burst. This process allows the build up of proteolytic enzymes and reactive oxygen species (ROS) which are necessary to break down the ECM and basement membrane. These are released in secretory granules, along with more integrins. The release of ROS and damaging enzymes is regulated to minimise host damage, but continues to reach site of infection at which it will carry out its effector functions.

== IL-8 mediated chemotaxis of the neutrophil ==
IL-8 is the primary cytokine involved in the recruitment of neutrophils to the site of damage or infection; in a process called chemotaxis. A number of variables are essential for the successful chemotaxis of neutrophils, including the increased expression of high affinity adhesion molecules to secure the neutrophil to the endothelium near the affected site (and is therefore not washed away into the circulatory system), and that the neutrophil can digest its way through the basement membrane and the extracellular matrix (ECM) to reach affected site. IL-8 plays a key role in inducing the cell signalling necessary to bring about these changes.

Firstly, at the site of infection histamine release causes vasodilation of the capillaries near the injured area which slows down the blood flow in the region and encourages leukocytes, such as neutrophils, to come closer to the endothelium, and away from the centre of the lumen where the rate of blood flow is highest. Once this occurs weak interactions are made between the selectins expressed on the neutrophil and endothelial cells (expression of which is also increased through the action of IL-8 and other cytokines). On the neutrophil these are: L selectins, and on the endothelial cell: P and E selectins. This causes the "rolling" phase of chemotaxis.

Once the neutrophil is rolling along the endothelium, it will come into contact with a IL-8 molecule expressed on the surface which stimulates the cell signalling pathway, mediated through a G-coupled-protein-receptor. The binding of IL-8 to CXCR1/2 on the neutrophil stimulates the neutrophils to upregulate their expression of the integrin, LFA-1 (Lymphocyte function-associated antigen 1), which takes part in high affinity bonding with ICAM-1(Intercellular Adhesion Molecule 1) receptors expressed on the endothelium. The expression and affinity of LFA-1 is significantly increased to maximise binding. This causes the neutrophil to slow down more until it is stationary.

== Target cells ==
While neutrophil granulocytes are the primary target cells of IL-8, there are a relatively wide range of cells (endothelial cells, macrophages, mast cells, and keratinocytes) that respond to this chemokine. The chemoattractant activity of IL-8 in similar concentrations to vertebrates was proven in Tetrahymena pyriformis, which suggests a phylogenetically well-conserved structure and function for this chemokine.

== Clinical significance ==
Interleukin-8 is a key mediator associated with inflammation where it plays a key role in neutrophil recruitment and neutrophil degranulation. As an example, it has been cited as a proinflammatory mediator in gingivitis and psoriasis.

IL-8 secretion is increased by oxidant stress, which thereby cause the recruitment of inflammatory cells and induces a further increase in oxidant stress mediators, making it a key parameter in localized inflammation. IL-8 was shown to be associated with obesity.

IL-8 has also been implied to have a role in colorectal cancer by acting as an autocrine growth factor for colon carcinoma cell lines or the promotion of division and possible migration by cleaving metalloproteinase molecules. It has also been shown that IL-8 plays an important role in chemoresistance of malignant pleural mesothelioma by inducing expression of transmembrane transporters.

If a pregnant mother has high levels of IL-8, there is an increased risk of schizophrenia in her offspring. High levels of Interleukin 8 have been shown to reduce the likelihood of positive responses to antipsychotic medication in schizophrenia.

Elevated cerebrospinal fluid (CSF) levels of IL-8 have been observed in individuals with schizophrenia, schizophrenia spectrum disorders, bipolar disorder, major depressive disorder, autism spectrum disorder, Parkinson's disease, dementia, and multiple sclerosis. In contrast, CSF IL-8 levels are significantly lower in individuals who have attempted suicide and show a negative correlation with anxiety symptoms in suicide attempters.

IL-8 has also been implicated in the pathology of cystic fibrosis. Through its action as a signalling molecule IL-8 is capable of recruiting and guiding neutrophils to the lung epithelium. Overstimulation and dysfunction of these recruited neutrophils within the airways results in release of a number of pro-inflammatory molecules and proteases resulting in further damage of lung tissue.

Some benzodiazepines have inhibitory effects on the adenosine A2B receptor mediated secretion of IL-8 in human mast cells. In a 2013 study, diazepam, 4′-chlorodiazepam and flunitrazepam markedly reduced NECA-induced IL-8 production in that order of potency, whereas clonazepam showed only a modest inhibition.

An increase in IL-8 levels has also been observed in relation to bronchiolitis, a common respiratory tract disease caused by viral infection.

== Modulators of CXCL8 ==
The production and release of CXCL8 (IL-8) can be influenced by multiple factors that regulate its expression and levels. Several cytokines and biochemical substances act as inducers of IL-8, including IL-1α, IL-1β, IL-7, IL-17, IL-22, tumor necrosis factor-alpha (TNF-α), histamine, stromal cell-derived factor-1 (SDF-1, CXCL12), lipopolysaccharides (LPSs), reactive oxygen species (ROS), cadmium (Cd), phytohemagglutinin (PHA), prostaglandin E2 (PGE2), polyinosinic-polycytidylic acid (poly I:C), concanavalin A (ConA), NaCl, thrombin, all-trans-retinoic acid (ATRA), and various other cellular stressors. Conversely, several cytokines and compounds demonstrate the ability to reduce IL-8 levels, including IL-4, IL-10, IL-35, transforming growth factor-beta 1 (TGF-β1), interferon-alpha (IFN-α), interferon-beta (IFN-β), glucocorticoids (GCs), lipoxins, vitamin D, lipoxygenase (LOX) inhibitors, antcin K, tannins, glycyrrhizin (GL), and N-acetylcysteine (NAC). The impact of these modulators on IL-8 levels is dependent on factors such as their concentration, duration of exposure, and the specific cellular context.

== Regulation of CXCL8 expression ==
The CXCL8 gene is located on chromosome 4q13-21 and consists of four exons and three introns, featuring a unique CAT- and TATA-like structure. The proximal promoter region, containing approximately 200 nucleotides within the 5′-flanking region, plays a significant role in transcriptional regulation of CXCL8. Notably, this 5′-flanking region differs significantly from other cytokine and acute-phase reactant genes.

In resting cells, CXCL8 is present at extremely low levels, making it difficult to detect. However, the expression of CXCL8 is induced by a range of factors and stressors, with transcription factors NF-κB and activator protein-1 (AP-1) playing key roles in mediating this response. This induction results in a significant increase in CXCL8 expression, typically ranging from 10- to 100-fold. IL-8 and other inflammatory cytokines form a vicious cycle with NF-κB.

Pathways leading to the induction of ribosomal protein S6 (rpS6) phosphorylation have also been found to enhance IL-8 protein synthesis. This translational control of IL-8 expression is dependent on AU-rich proximal sequences (APS), which are found in the 3' untranslated region (3' UTR) of IL-8 immediately after the stop codon. The 3' UTR of CXCL8 also contains adenylate-uridylate-rich elements (AREs), which accelerate mRNA degradation.

Additionally, MicroRNA-146a-5p (miR-146a-5p) indirectly represses IL-8 expression by silencing IRAK1. Among multiple microRNAs (miRs), miR-146a-5p has been identified as an anti-inflammatory regulator targeting signal molecules in the NF-κB pathway.

Notably, genetic polymorphisms in the CXCL8 gene can influence its transcriptional activity, potentially altering IL-8 production and contributing to variations in disease susceptibility, progression, and severity among individuals.

== Nomenclature ==
IL-8 was renamed CXCL8 by the Chemokine Nomenclature Subcommittee of the International Union of Immunological Societies,. Its approved HUGO gene symbol is CXCL8. Its receptors were similarly renamed:

- Interleukin 8 receptor, alpha — CXCR1
- Interleukin 8 receptor, beta — CXCR2
