= Interferon-lambda receptor =

Type II cytokine receptor

interferon lambda receptor 1

Identifiers
- Symbol: IFNLR1
- Alt. symbols: IL28RA, CRF2/12, IFNLR, IL-28R1
- NCBI gene: 163702
- HGNC: 18584
- OMIM: 607404
- RefSeq: NM_170743
- UniProt: Q8IU57

Other data
- Locus: Chr. 1 p36.11
Search for
- Structures: Swiss-model
- Domains: InterPro

interleukin 10 receptor, beta

Identifiers
- Symbol: IL10RB
- Alt. symbols: CRFB4, D21S58, D21S66
- NCBI gene: 3588
- HGNC: 5965
- OMIM: 123889
- RefSeq: NM_000628
- UniProt: Q08334

Other data
- Locus: Chr. 21 q22.1-22.2
Search for
- Structures: Swiss-model
- Domains: InterPro

Interferon-lambda receptor (IFNLR), formerly known as the interleukin-28 receptor (IL28R), is a type II cytokine receptor found largely in epithelial cells. It binds the type III interferons (IFN-λs), which in humans include IFN-λ1 (IL29), IFN-λ2 (IL28A), IFN-λ3 (IL28B), and IFN-λ4. It is a heterodimer of two chains, α (IFNLR1) and β (IL10RB, shared with the interleukin-10 receptor).

This receptor is restricted to select cell types and plays an important role in fighting infection. Binding of the type 3 interferons to the receptor results in activation of the JAK/STAT signaling pathway.

== Structure ==
IFNLR consists of IFNLR1 (α) and IL10RB (β) chains, a typical type II cytokine receptor. The α chain is important for recognition and ligand specificity, while the β is crucial in signaling. The β chain is also used in the receptors for other cytokines such as IL-10, IL-22, IL-26, and IL-20.

== Location ==
While the type 1 interferon receptor is diversely distributed, IFNLR expression is more restricted, particularly the α chain. The receptor is expressed largely in epithelial cells, specifically keratinocytes and melanocytes found in the epidermis. The receptor is also highly expressed in cells of the lung, kidney, intestinal tract, liver, heart and prostate. Relatively high expression has also been documented in immune cells such as dendritic cells. Other immune cell types such as Natural killer cells, monocytes, T cells and B cells, though expressing significant amounts of the IL28RA mRNA, were unresponsive to type 3 interferons. Cells such as those in the central nervous system, uterus, bone marrow, testis and skeletal muscle have low mRNA levels and do not respond to the interferon lambdas.

== Function ==
On binding of a type 3 interferon to the α chain, the β chain is recruited leading to the activation of two tyrosine kinases, JAK1 and tyrosine kinase 2 (tyk2). As a result STAT-1 and STAT-2 are recruited and phosphorylated. These two transcription factors then combine with IRF9 to form a complex known as the interferon stimulated gene factor 3 complex (ISGF3). This enters the nucleus and binds to promoter regions, causing transcription of various genes called Interferon induced genes (ISGs) Researchers have also found that the binding of the type 3 interferons to their receptor also leads to phosphorylation of STAT-3, STAT-4, and STAT-5. In addition to the JAK/STAT pathway, other pathways such as the MAPK and PI3 kinase pathways have been discovered to be activated as a result of this ligand receptor binding.

The result of the above cascade can be observed as inhibition of cell growth and an increase in MHC class 1 production. Macrophages and monocytes would start producing IL-6, IL-8, and IL-10. Naïve and memory T cells respond by reducing production of IL-5 and IL-13 and increasing interferon gamma production. Signaling from the receptor also causes increased cytotoxicity in Natural killer cells and Cytotoxic T cells, increased T helper cell 1 responses and MHC class 1 expression on tumor cells.

== Regulation ==
Researchers have noted that IFNLR1 gene expression is increased during stimulation by other interferons. There is also an increased expression of IFNLR1 on the surface during maturation of monocytes to macrophages. While the signaling cascade induced by type 3 interferons binding to their receptor results in significant protection from infections, the response must be regulated to prevent uncontrolled inflammation and apoptosis. Mechanisms involved in regulation can include induction of suppressor of cytokine signaling proteins (SOCSs). There also exists a soluble splice variant of the receptor that can bind the type 3 interferons thus negatively regulating signaling.

== Clinical significance ==
Studies show that signaling of the interferon lambdas via the IFNLR reduces tumorigenicity of cancer cells and causes apoptosis.In addition, increasing expression of IFNLR increases the anticancer effects of interferon lambdas. The signaling cascade from the receptor has also been seen to reduce proliferation on human cell lines such as the BON1 pancreatic neuroendocrine tumor cell lines.Signaling through the IL-28R also protects against viruses such as encephalomyocarditis virus and vesicular stomatitis virus as well as the hepatitis B virus in hepatocytes.
