= Interleukin 29 =

Protein-coding gene in the species Homo sapiens

IFNL1
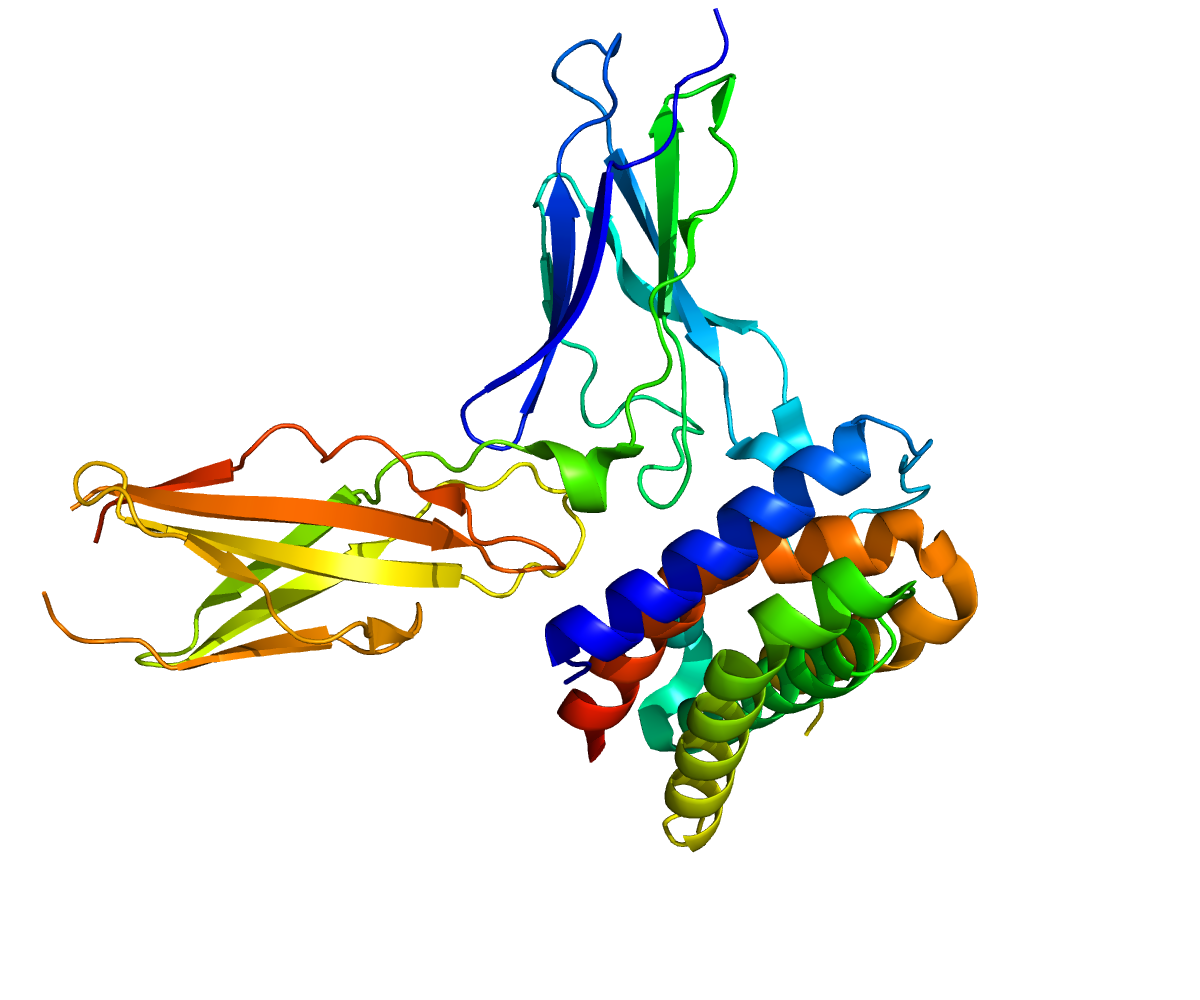

Identifiers
- Aliases: IFNL1, IL-29, IL29, interferon, lambda 1, interferon lambda 1
- External IDs: OMIM: 607403; MGI: 3647279; GeneCards: IFNL1
Available structures
PDB	Ortholog search: PDBe RCSB
PDB	List of PDB id codes 3OG6, 3OG4

Gene location (Human)
Chr.	Chromosome 19 (human)
Band	19q13.2	Start	39,296,407 bp
Band	19q13.2	End	39,298,673 bp

Gene location (Mouse)
Chr.	Chromosome 7 (mouse)
Band	7 A3|7	Start	28,208,261 bp
Band	7 A3|7	End	28,209,880 bp
RNA expression pattern
Bgee	Human / Mouse (ortholog); Top expressed in: testicle; granulocyte; skin of thigh; gonad; blood; spleen; duodenum; cecum; appendix; respiratory system / Top expressed in: thymus; spleen; More reference expression data
BioGPS	n/a
Gene ontology
Molecular function	cytokine activity; interleukin-28 receptor binding; signaling receptor binding
Cellular component	interleukin-28 receptor complex; intracellular anatomical structure; extracellular region; extracellular space
Biological process	receptor signaling pathway via JAK-STAT; negative regulation of interleukin-5 production; positive regulation of tyrosine phosphorylation of STAT protein; positive regulation of interferon-gamma production; negative regulation of interleukin-13 production; positive regulation of transcription, DNA-templated; positive regulation of immune response; defense response to virus; negative regulation of type 2 immune response; innate immune response; negative regulation of transcription, DNA-templated; positive regulation of MHC class I biosynthetic process; negative regulation of memory T cell differentiation; negative regulation of T cell differentiation; positive regulation of receptor signaling pathway via JAK-STAT; negative regulation of cell population proliferation; regulation of signaling receptor activity; cytokine-mediated signaling pathway
Sources:Amigo / QuickGO
Orthologs
Databases	NCBI: entry; OMA: entry
Species	Human	Mouse
Entrez	282618	330496
Ensembl	ENSG00000182393	ENSMUSG00000059128
UniProt	Q8IU54	Q4VK74
RefSeq (mRNA)	NM_172140	NM_001024673
RefSeq (protein)	NP_742152	NP_001019844
Location (UCSC)	Chr 19: 39.3 – 39.3 Mb	Chr 7: 28.21 – 28.21 Mb
PubMed search
- Wikidata
View/Edit Human	View/Edit Mouse

Interleukin-29 (IL-29) is a cytokine and it belongs to type III interferons group, also termed interferons λ (IFN-λ). IL-29 (alternative name IFNλ1) plays an important role in the immune response against pathogenes and especially against viruses by mechanisms similar to type I interferons, but targeting primarily cells of epithelial origin and hepatocytes.

IL-29 is encoded by the IFNL1 gene located on chromosome 19 in humans. It is a pseudogene in mice meaning the IL-29 protein is not produced in them.

== Structure ==
IL-29 is, with the rest of IFN-λ, structurally related to the IL-10 family, but its primary amino acid sequence (and also function) is more similar to type I interferons. It binds to a heterodimeric receptor composed of one subunit IFNL1R specific for IFN-λ and a second subunit IL10RB shared among the IL-10 family cytokines.

== Function ==
=== Effects on immune response to pathogens ===
IL-29 exhibits antiviral effects by inducing similar signaling pathways as type I interferons. IL-29 receptor signals through JAK-STAT pathways leading to activated expression of interferon-stimulated genes and production of antiviral proteins. Further consequences of IL-29 signalization comprise the upregulated expression of MHC class I molecules, or enhanced expression of the costimulatory molecules and chemokine receptors on pDC, which are the main producers of IFN-α.

IL-29 expression is dominant in virus-infected epithelial cells of the respiratory, gastrointestinal and urogenital tracts, also in other mucosal tissues and skin. Hepatocytes infected by HCV or HBV viruses stimulate the immune response by producing IL-29 (IFN-λ in general) rather than type I interferons. It is also produced by maturing macrophages, dendritic cells or mastocytes.

It plays a role in defense against pathogens apart from viruses. It affects the function of both innate and adaptive immune system. Besides described antiviral effects, IL-29 modulates cytokine production of other cells, for example, it increases secretion of IL-6, IL-8 and IL-10 by monocytes and macrophages, enhances the responsiveness of macrophages to IFN-γ by increased expression of IFNGR1, stimulates T cell polarization towards Th1 phenotype and also B cell response to IL-29 was reported.

=== Antitumor immunity ===
The impact of IL-29 on cancer cells is complicated depending on cancer cell type. It shows protective tumor inhibiting effects in many cases such as skin, lung, colorectal or hepatocellular cancer, but shows tumor promoting effects on multiple myeloma cells. IFN-λ have potential as cancer therapy, with effects on more restricted cell types and fewer side-effects than type I interferons.

=== Autoimmune diseases ===
Abnormal expression of IL-29 could be involved in the pathogenesis of the autoimmune diseases by enhancing the production of inflammatory cytokines, chemokines, and other autoimmune‐related components. High levels of IL-29 in serum or disease-specific tissue was observed in patients with rheumatoid arthritis, osteoarthritis, systemic lupus erythematosus, Sjögren's syndrome, psoriasis, atopic dermatitis, Hashimoto's thyroiditis, systemic sclerosis and uveitis.
