= Interferon gamma receptor (IFNGR1) family =

Interferon gamma receptor (IFNGR1)
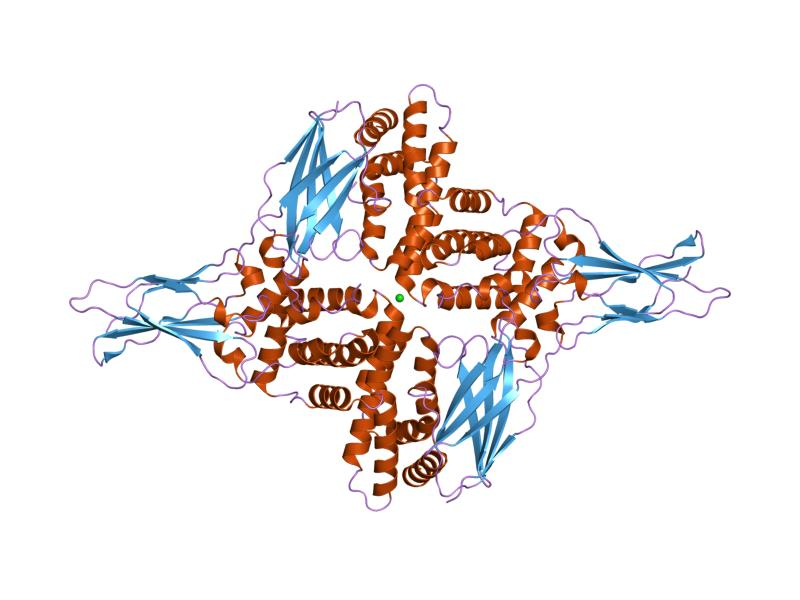
- 1:1 complex between an interferon gamma single-chain variant and its receptor

Identifiers
- Symbol: IFNGR1
- Pfam: PF07140
- Pfam clan: CL0159
- InterPro: IPR008355
- SCOP2: 1fg9 / SCOPe / SUPFAM
- Membranome: 1318
Available protein structures:
- PDB: IPR008355 PF07140 (ECOD; PDBsum)
- AlphaFold: IPR008355; PF07140

In molecular biology, the interferon gamma receptor (IFNGR1) family is a family of proteins which includes several eukaryotic and viral interferon gamma receptor proteins.

Members of this family include:

- The human (bony fish in general) interferon gamma receptor 1, which is a member of the hematopoietic cytokine receptor superfamily. It is expressed in a membrane-bound form in many cell types, and is over-expressed in tumour cells. It comprises an extracellular portion of 229 amino acid residues, a single transmembrane region, and a cytoplasmic domain of 221 amino acid residues. As with other members of its superfamily, the cytokine-binding sites are formed by a small set of closely spaced surface loops that extend from a beta-sheet core, much like antigen-binding sites on antibodies.
- The vaccinia virus interferon (IFN)-gamma receptor (IFN-gammaR), which is a 43 kDa soluble glycoprotein that is secreted from infected cells early during infection. IFN-gammaR from vaccinia virus, cowpox virus and camelpox virus exist naturally as homodimers, whereas the cellular IFN-gammaR dimerises only upon binding the homodimeric IFN-gamma. The existence of the virus protein as a dimer in the absence of ligand may provide an advantage to the virus in efficient binding and inhibition of IFN-gamma in solution.
