= Interferon-gamma receptor =

Mammalian protein found in Homo sapiens

interferon gamma receptor 1
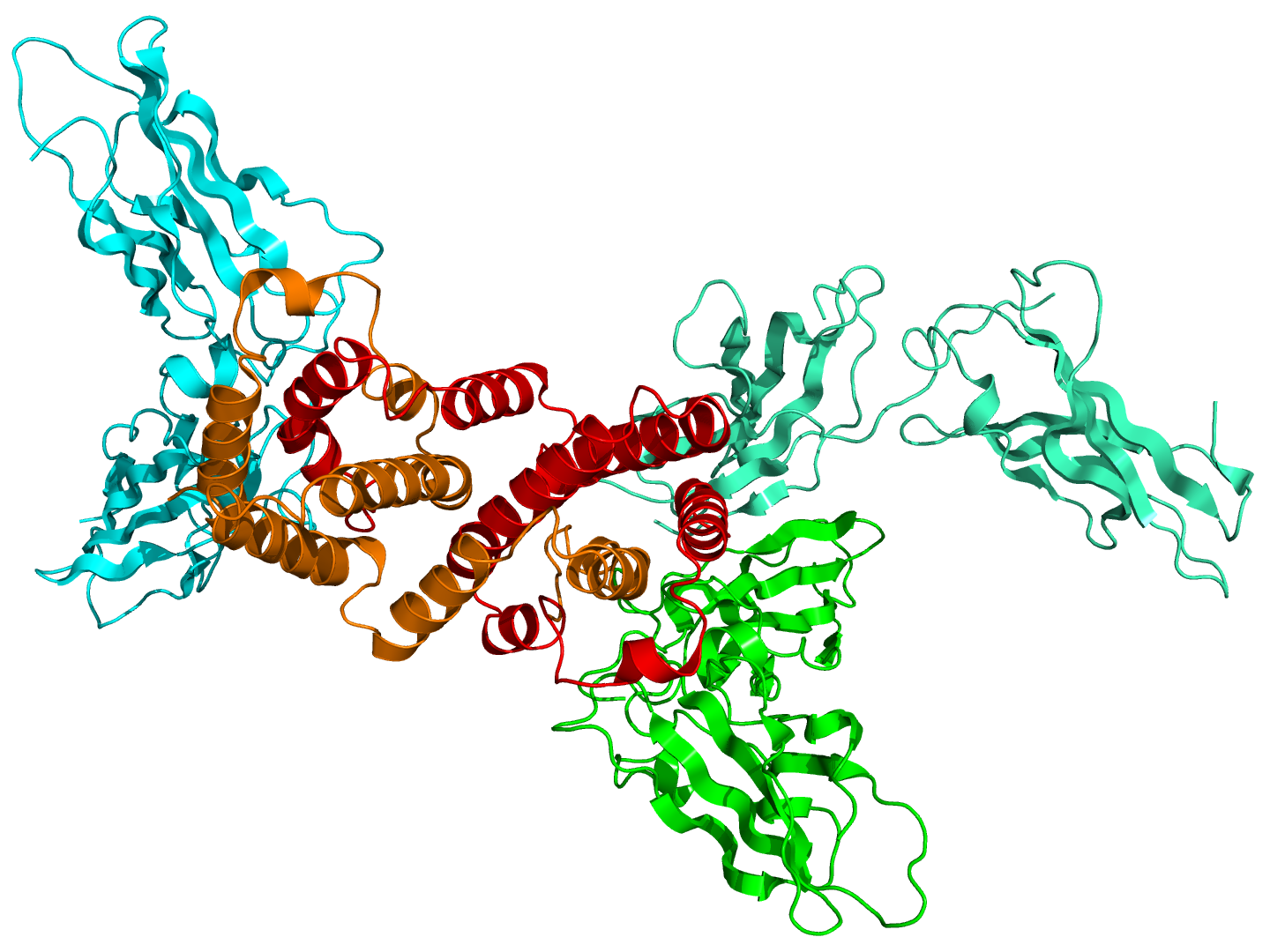
- Crystallographic structure of a 3:2 complex of the IFN-γ receptor alpha chain (IFNGR1) (green, cyan, and green/cyan) and the IFN-γ ligand (red and orange).

Identifiers
- Symbol: IFNGR1
- Alt. symbols: IFNGR
- NCBI gene: 3459
- HGNC: 5439
- OMIM: 107470
- RefSeq: NM_000416
- UniProt: P15260

Other data
- Locus: Chr. 6 q23-q24
Search for
- Structures: Swiss-model
- Domains: InterPro

interferon gamma receptor 2 (interferon gamma transducer 1)

Identifiers
- Symbol: IFNGR2
- Alt. symbols: IFNGT1
- NCBI gene: 3460
- HGNC: 5440
- OMIM: 147569
- RefSeq: NM_005534
- UniProt: P38484

Other data
- Locus: Chr. 21 q22.1
Search for
- Structures: Swiss-model
- Domains: InterPro

The interferon-gamma receptor (IFNGR) protein complex is the heterodimer of two chains: IFNGR1 and IFNGR2. It binds interferon-γ, the sole member of interferon type II.

== Structure and function ==
In unstimulated cells, these subunits are not preassociated with each other but rather associate through their intracellular domains with inactive forms of specific Janus family kinases (Jak1 and Jak2). Jak1 and Jak2 constitutively associate with IFNGR1 and IFNGR2, respectively.

Binding of IFN-γ to IFNGR1 induces the rapid dimerization of IFNGR1 chains, thereby forming a site that is recognized by the extracellular domain of IFNGR2. The ligand-induced assembly of the complete receptor complex contains two IFNGR1 and two IFNGR2 subunits, which bring into close juxtaposition the intracellular domains of these proteins together with the inactive Jak1 and Jak2 kinases that they associate with. In this complex, Jak1 and Jak2 transactivate one another and then phosphorylate IFNGR1, thereby forming a paired set of Stat1 docking sites on the ligated receptor. Two Stat1 molecules then associate with the paired docking sites, are brought into close proximity with receptor-associated-activated JAK kinases, and are activated by phosphorylatio of the Stat1. Tyrosine-phosphorylated Stat1 molecules dissociate from their receptor tether and form homodimeric complexes. Activated Stat1 translocates to the nucleus and, after binding to a specific sequence in the promoter region of immediate-early IFN-γ-inducible genes, effects gene transcription.

== Disease linkage ==
IFNGR1 deficiency is associated with the increased susceptibility to certain infectious diseases in patients, especially mycobacterial infections.

=== Mutations ===
Disseminated BCG infections occur in infants with SCID or with other severe T cell defects. However, in approximately half of the cases no specific host defect has been found. One possible explanation for this predilection was found in a 2.5-month-old Tunisian female infant who had fatal idiopathic disseminated BCG infection. In four children from Malta who had disseminated atypical mycobacterial infection in the absence of a recognized immunodeficiency. In the case of all five children, there was consanguinity in their pedigrees. All affected were found to have a functional defect in the upregulation of TNFα production by their blood macrophages in response to stimulation with IFNγ. Furthermore, all lacked expression of IFNγR's on their blood monocytes or lymphocytes, and each was found to have a mutation in the gene on chromosome 6q22-q23 that encodes IFNγR1. Of interest, these children did not appear to be susceptible to infection with agents other than mycobacteria. Th1 responses appeared to be normal in these patients. The susceptibility of these children to mycobacterial infections thus apparently results from an intrinsic impairment of the IFNγ pathway response to these particular intracellular pathogens, showing that IFNγ is obligatory for efficient macrophage antimycobacterial activity. Since the initial discoveries of IFNγR1-deficient humans, many more examples have been found, and IFNγR2-deficient individuals have been found as well.

== Viral decoy ==
Some poxviruses, including but not limited to the variola (smallpox) virus and the mousepox virus, encode a protein similar to IFNGR1 in their genome, often called the IFN-γ binding protein (IFNγbp). IFNγbp acts a decoy receptor that sequesters IFN-γ to prevent the activation of the host receptor. The result is diminished interferon response.

== See also ==
- Interferon-γ Receptor-1 and 2 Mutations
- Interferon gamma receptor (IFNGR1) family
