= Interferon gamma 5' UTR regulatory element =

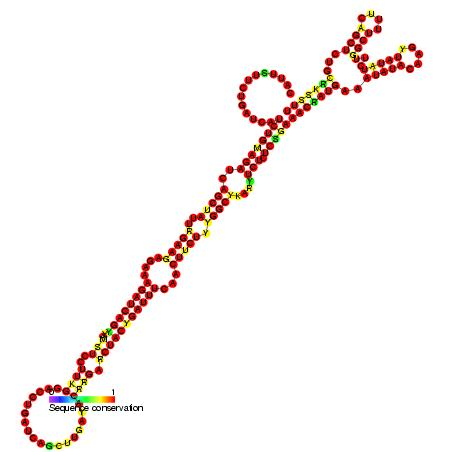
- Predicted secondary structure and sequence conservation of IFN_gamma

Identifiers
- Symbol: IFN_gamma
- Rfam: RF00259

Other data
- RNA type: Cis-reg
- Domain(s): Eukaryota
- SO: SO:0000204
- PDB structures: PDBe

Interferon gamma 5' UTR regulatory elements are a family of regulatory RNAs. This family represents a pseudoknot containing stem-loop structure found in the 5' UTR of interferon-gamma mRNA. This structure is thought to be involved in translational regulation and the pseudoknot has been found to activate protein kinase R (PKR) which is known to be a translational inhibitor. Mutations in the pseudoknot structure have been found to reduce PKR activation and increase the translation of interferon-gamma.
