= Interferon lambda receptor 1 =

Protein found in humans

IFNLR1
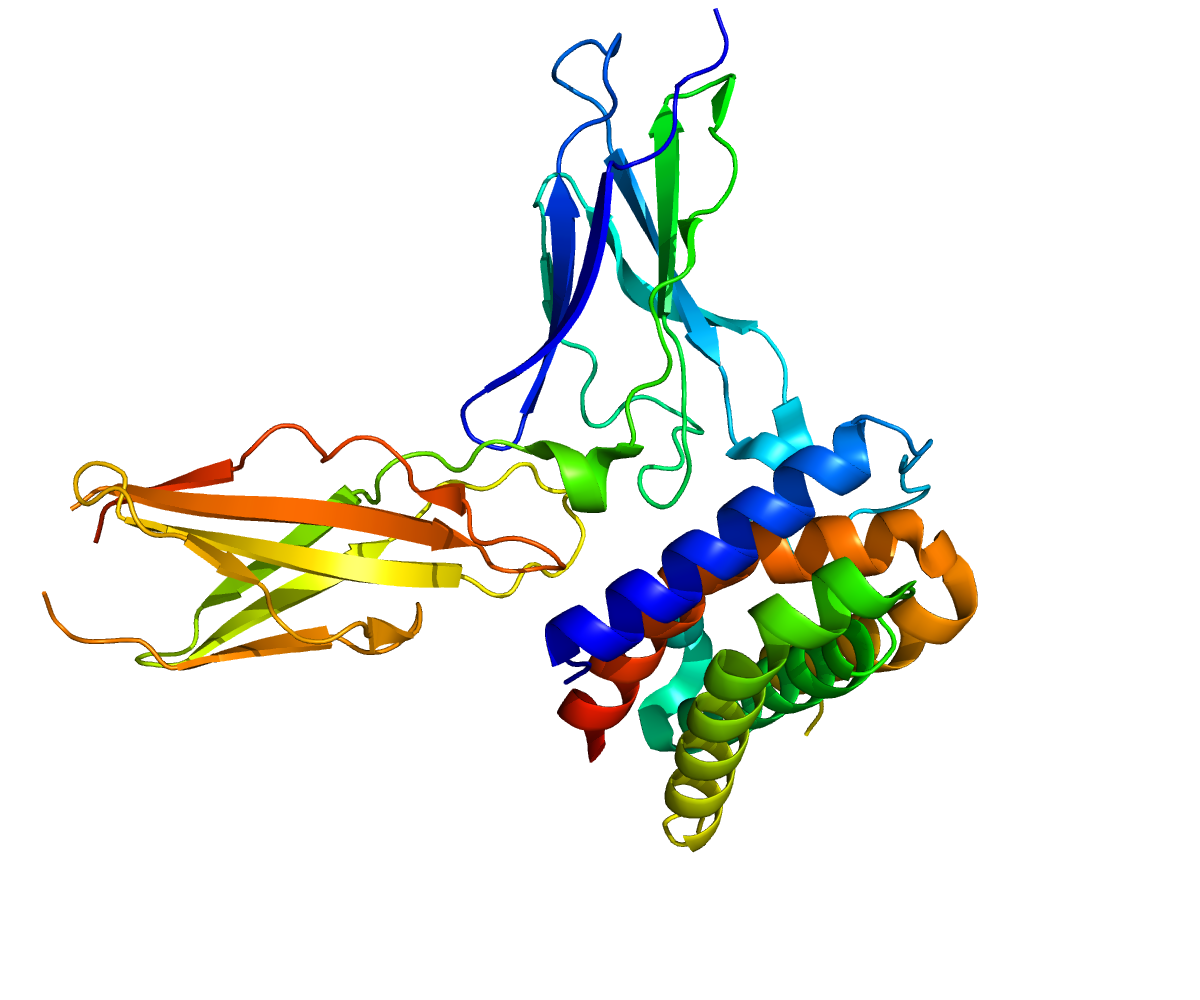

Identifiers
- Aliases: IFNLR1, CRF2/12, IFNLR, IL-28R1, IL28RA, LICR2, Interleukin 28 receptor, alpha subunit, interferon lambda receptor 1
- External IDs: OMIM: 607404; MGI: 2429859; GeneCards: IFNLR1
Available structures
PDB	Ortholog search: PDBe RCSB
PDB	List of PDB id codes 3OG4, 3OG6, 5IXI, 5IXD

Gene location (Human)
Chr.	Chromosome 1 (human)
Band	1p36.11	Start	24,154,168 bp
Band	1p36.11	End	24,187,959 bp

Gene location (Mouse)
Chr.	Chromosome 4 (mouse)
Band	4|4 D3	Start	135,413,598 bp
Band	4|4 D3	End	135,435,492 bp
RNA expression pattern
Bgee	Human / Mouse (ortholog); Top expressed in: mucosa of ileum; jejunal mucosa; buccal mucosa cell; right lobe of liver; testicle; mucosa of sigmoid colon; cerebellar vermis; duodenum; cerebellar hemisphere; lymph node / Top expressed in: granulocyte; urethra; jejunum; transitional epithelium of urinary bladder; middle ear; lip; ileum; duodenum; esophagus; Hindgut; More reference expression data
BioGPS	n/a
Gene ontology
Molecular function	cytokine receptor activity; protein binding
Cellular component	integral component of membrane; interleukin-28 receptor complex; membrane; plasma membrane
Biological process	response to type III interferon; mucosal immune response; defense response to virus; negative regulation of cell population proliferation; regulation of defense response to virus by host; cytokine-mediated signaling pathway
Sources:Amigo / QuickGO
Orthologs
Databases	NCBI: entry; OMA: entry
Species	Human	Mouse
Entrez	163702	242700
Ensembl	ENSG00000185436	ENSMUSG00000062157
UniProt	Q8IU57	Q8CGK5
RefSeq (mRNA)	NM_170743; NM_173064; NM_173065	NM_174851
RefSeq (protein)	NP_734464; NP_775087; NP_775088	NP_777276
Location (UCSC)	Chr 1: 24.15 – 24.19 Mb	Chr 4: 135.41 – 135.44 Mb
PubMed search
- Wikidata
View/Edit Human	View/Edit Mouse

Interferon lambda receptor 1 is a subunit for the interferon lambda receptor encoded by the IFNLR1 gene. It was formerly known as interleukin 28 receptor, alpha subunit. IL28RA is its human gene.

The protein encoded by this gene belongs to the class II cytokine receptor family. This protein forms a receptor complex with interleukin 10 receptor, beta (IL10RB). The receptor complex has been shown to interact with interferon type III (IL28A, IL28B, IL29). The expression of all three cytokines can be induced by viral infection. The cells overexpressing this protein have been found to have enhanced responses to IL28A and IL29, but decreased response to IL28B. Three alternatively spliced transcript variants encoding distinct isoforms have been reported.
