= Interleukin 10 receptor, alpha subunit =

Protein-coding gene in the species Homo sapiens

IL10RA
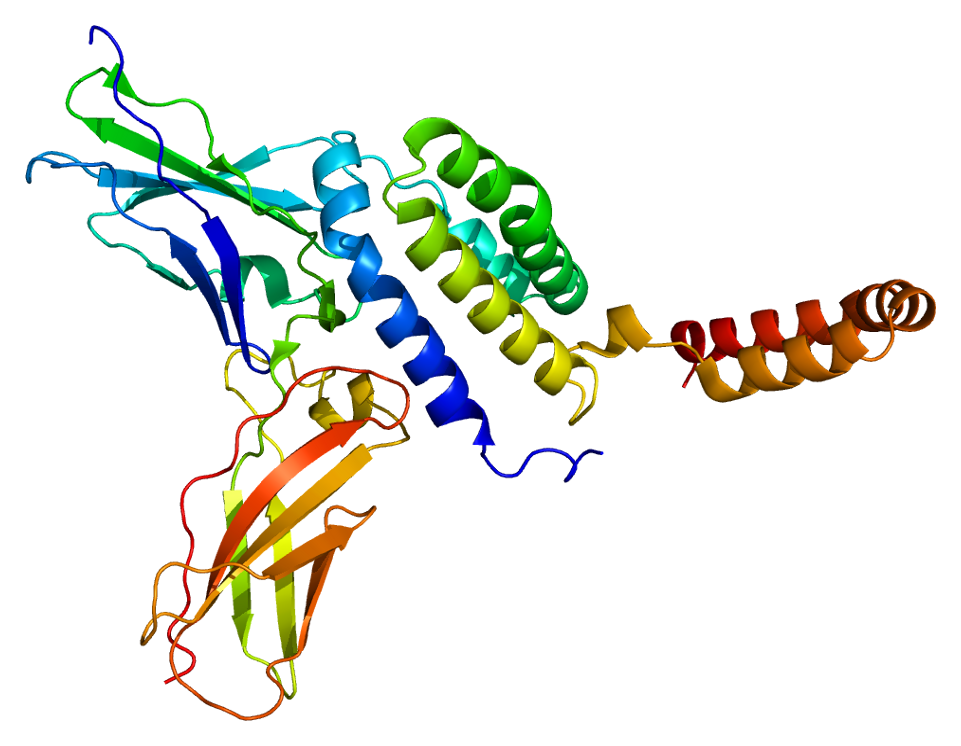

Identifiers
- Aliases: IL10RA, CD210, CD210a, CDW210A, HIL-10R, IL-10R1, IL10R, Interleukin 10 receptor, alpha subunit, interleukin 10 receptor subunit alpha
- External IDs: OMIM: 146933; MGI: 96538; GeneCards: IL10RA
Available structures
PDB	Ortholog search: PDBe RCSB
PDB	List of PDB id codes 1J7V, 1LQS, 1Y6K, 1Y6M, 1Y6N, 5IXI

Gene location (Human)
Chr.	Chromosome 11 (human)
Band	11q23.3	Start	117,986,370 bp
Band	11q23.3	End	118,003,037 bp

Gene location (Mouse)
Chr.	Chromosome 9 (mouse)
Band	9 A5.2|9 24.84 cM	Start	45,165,135 bp
Band	9 A5.2|9 24.84 cM	End	45,180,447 bp
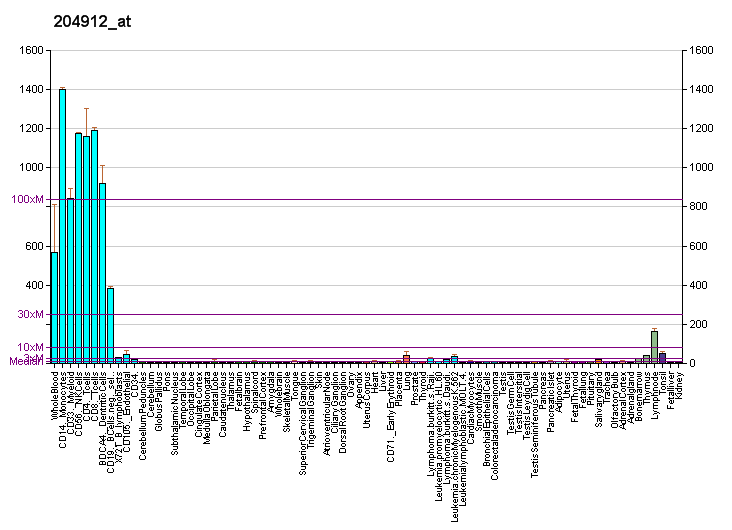
RNA expression pattern
Bgee	Human / Mouse (ortholog); Top expressed in: granulocyte; mononuclear cell; monocyte; blood; spleen; bone marrow cell; lymph node; appendix; gallbladder; rectum / Top expressed in: granulocyte; spleen; stroma of bone marrow; mesenteric lymph nodes; blood; embryo; ankle joint; thymus; subcutaneous adipose tissue; superior frontal gyrus; More reference expression data
BioGPS	More reference expression data
Gene ontology
Molecular function	protein binding; interleukin-10 binding; signal transducer activity; interleukin-10 receptor activity; signaling receptor activity; cytokine receptor activity
Cellular component	integral component of membrane; membrane; plasma membrane; cytoplasm
Biological process	response to lipopolysaccharide; regulation of synapse organization; cytokine-mediated signaling pathway; negative regulation of autophagy; positive regulation of receptor signaling pathway via JAK-STAT; ubiquitin-dependent endocytosis
Sources:Amigo / QuickGO
Orthologs
Databases	NCBI: entry; OMA: entry
Species	Human	Mouse
Entrez	3587	16154
Ensembl	ENSG00000110324	ENSMUSG00000032089
UniProt	Q13651	Q61727
RefSeq (mRNA)	NM_001558	NM_008348; NM_001324486
RefSeq (protein)	NP_001549	NP_001311415; NP_032374
Location (UCSC)	Chr 11: 117.99 – 118 Mb	Chr 9: 45.17 – 45.18 Mb
PubMed search
- Wikidata
View/Edit Human	View/Edit Mouse

Interleukin-10 receptor subunit alpha is a subunit for the interleukin-10 receptor. IL10RA is its human gene.

IL10RA has also been designated CDw210a (cluster of differentiation w210a).

== Function ==
The protein encoded by this gene is a receptor for interleukin 10. This protein is structurally related to interferon receptors. It has been shown to mediate the immunosuppressive signal of interleukin 10, and thus inhibits the synthesis of proinflammatory cytokines. This receptor is reported to promote survival of myeloid progenitor cells through the insulin receptor substrate-2/PI 3-kinase/AKT pathway. Activation of this receptor leads to tyrosine phosphorylation of JAK1 and TYK2 kinases.

== Interactions ==
Interleukin 10 receptor, alpha subunit has been shown to interact with:

- Interleukin 10 and
- Janus kinase 1.
