= Interferon lambda 3 =

Protein-coding gene in the species Homo sapiens

IFNL3

Identifiers
- Aliases: IFNL3, IL-28B, IL28B, IL28C, Interleukin 28B, interferon, lambda 3, interferon lambda 3, IFN-lambda-3, IFN-lambda-4, IL-28C
- External IDs: OMIM: 607402; MGI: 2450574; GeneCards: IFNL3
Available structures
| PDB | Ortholog search: PDBe RCSB |
| PDB | List of PDB id codes 3HHC |

Gene location (Human)
| Chr. | Chromosome 19 (human) |
| Band | 19q13.2 | Start | 39,243,455 bp |
| Band | 19q13.2 | End | 39,245,250 bp |

Gene location (Mouse)
| Chr. | Chromosome 7 (mouse) |
| Band | 7|7 A3 | Start | 28,222,261 bp |
| Band | 7|7 A3 | End | 28,223,747 bp |
RNA expression pattern
| Bgee | Human / Mouse (ortholog); Top expressed in: testicle; gonad; superior frontal gyrus; prefrontal cortex; blood; skin of abdomen; placenta; temporal lobe; amygdala; urinary bladder / Top expressed in: thymus; spleen; More reference expression data |
| BioGPS | n/a |
Gene ontology
| Molecular function | cytokine activity; signaling receptor binding |
| Cellular component | intracellular anatomical structure; extracellular space; extracellular region |
| Biological process | receptor signaling pathway via JAK-STAT; negative regulation of viral genome replication; positive regulation of immune response; innate immune response; defense response to virus; regulation of T cell activation; regulation of signaling receptor activity; cytokine-mediated signaling pathway |
Sources:Amigo / QuickGO
Orthologs
| Databases | NCBI: entry; OMA: entry |
| Species | Human | Mouse |
| Entrez | 282617 | 338374 |
| Ensembl | ENSG00000197110 | ENSMUSG00000060747 |
| UniProt | Q8IZI9 | Q8CGK6 |
| RefSeq (mRNA) | NM_172139; NM_001346937 | NM_177396 |
| RefSeq (protein) | NP_001333866; NP_742151 | NP_796370 |
| Location (UCSC) | Chr 19: 39.24 – 39.25 Mb | Chr 7: 28.22 – 28.22 Mb |
| PubMed search |
- Wikidata
| View/Edit Human | View/Edit Mouse |

Interferon lambda 3 encodes the IFNL3 protein. IFNL3 was formerly named IL28B, but the Human Genome Organization Gene Nomenclature Committee renamed this gene in 2013 while assigning a name to the then newly discovered IFNL4 gene. Together with IFNL1 (formerly IL29) and IFNL2 (formerly IL28A), these genes lie in a cluster on chromosomal region 19q13. IFNL3 shares ~96% amino-acid identity with IFNL2, ~80% identity with IFNL1 and ~30% identity with IFNL4.

Interferon lambda genes encode cytokines classified as type III interferons, which are distantly related to type I interferons and the IL-10 family. Type III interferons are induced by viral infection and interact with a heterodimeric class II cytokine receptor that consists of interleukin 10 receptor, beta (IL10RB) and interferon lambda receptor 1 (IFNLR1) to signal via the JAK-STAT anti-viral pathway. [provided by RefSeq, Jul 2008].

== Hepatitis C ==
=== Variants moved to IFNL4 ===
In 2009 (i.e., before the discovery of IFNL4, results from genome wide association studies (GWAS) indicated that single-nucleotide polymorphisms (SNPs) lying near IFNL3 (rs12979860, rs8099917 and others) were strongly associated with response to pegylated interferon-α and ribavirin treatment for chronic hepatitis C, as well as spontaneous clearance of hepatitis C (HCV) infection. The gene then known as IL28B (now IFNL3) was the closest known gene at the time, so these genetic variants were called "IL28B variants." It was assumed that the observed associations reflected differences in the structure or regulation of that gene. However, discovery of IFNL4 revealed that the rs12979860 SNP is located within intron 1 of IFNL4, while rs8099917 lies in an intergenic region, but nearest to IFNL4. The rs12979860 and rs8099917 SNPs are in high linkage disequilibrium with a variant of IFNL4 (IFNL4-ΔG/TT; rs368234815) that controls generation of the IFNL4 protein. IFNL4-ΔG/TT appears to be the functional polymorphism that accounts for GWAS associations of nearby SNPs with HCV clearance, and IFNL4-ΔG/TT was shown to have stronger statistical association with HCV clearance than that of rs12979860, especially in populations of African ancestry in which linkage disequilibrium between these variants is weaker than in other populations.

=== Actual IFNL3 variants ===
One possible functional variant in IFNL3 is the rs4803217 SNP, which lies in the 3' untranslated regulatory region. Substitution of guanine for the ancestral thymine at this site increases IFNL3 mRNA expression by decreasing mRNA degradation and HCV-induced microRNA binding and changes the RNA structure. High linkage disequilibrium exists between rs4803217 and the IFNL4-ΔG/TT variant. rs4803217 has been shown to associate with HCV clearance, however, that association appears to stem from linkage disequilibrium with IFNL4-ΔG/TT rather than a direct functional effect of the rs4803217 SNP itself.
