= Interleukin 10 receptor, beta subunit =

Protein-coding gene in the species Homo sapiens

IL10RB

Identifiers
- Aliases: IL10RB, CDW210B, CRF2-4, CRFB4, D21S58, D21S66, IL-10R2, Interleukin 10 receptor, beta subunit, interleukin 10 receptor subunit beta
- External IDs: OMIM: 123889; MGI: 109380; GeneCards: IL10RB
Available structures
PDB	Ortholog search: PDBe RCSB
PDB	List of PDB id codes 3LQM

Gene location (Human)
Chr.	Chromosome 21 (human)
Band	21q22.11	Start	33,266,367 bp
Band	21q22.11	End	33,310,187 bp

Gene location (Mouse)
Chr.	Chromosome 16 (mouse)
Band	16 C3.3|16 52.87 cM	Start	91,203,052 bp
Band	16 C3.3|16 52.87 cM	End	91,222,722 bp
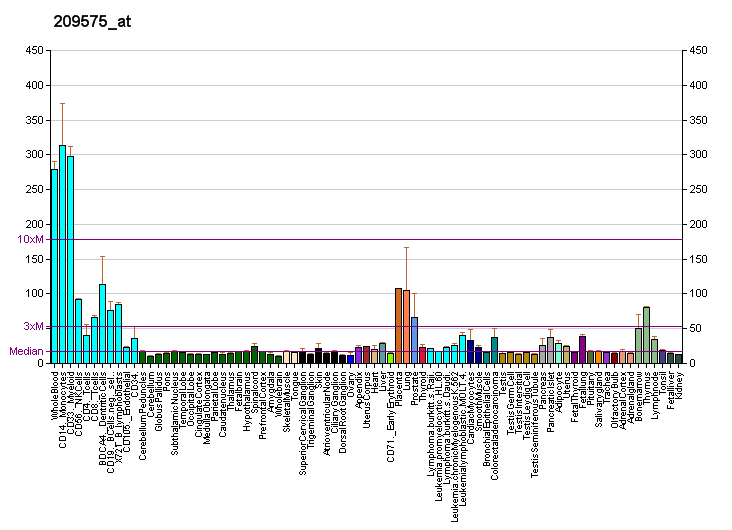
RNA expression pattern
Bgee	Human / Mouse (ortholog); Top expressed in: placenta; monocyte; blood; granulocyte; mucosa of transverse colon; rectum; spleen; duodenum; appendix; gallbladder / Top expressed in: Ileal epithelium; adrenal gland; cardiac muscle tissue of left ventricle; stroma of bone marrow; interventricular septum; right ventricle; granulocyte; right lung lobe; choroid plexus of fourth ventricle; lumbar spinal ganglion; More reference expression data
BioGPS	More reference expression data
Gene ontology
Molecular function	protein binding; interleukin-10 receptor activity; signaling receptor activity; cytokine receptor activity
Cellular component	integral component of membrane; interleukin-28 receptor complex; membrane; plasma membrane
Biological process	inflammatory response; defense response to virus; immune response; signal transduction; cytokine-mediated signaling pathway; positive regulation of receptor signaling pathway via JAK-STAT
Sources:Amigo / QuickGO
Orthologs
Databases	NCBI: entry; OMA: entry
Species	Human	Mouse
Entrez	3588	16155
Ensembl	ENSG00000243646	ENSMUSG00000022969
UniProt	Q08334	Q61190
RefSeq (mRNA)	NM_000628	NM_008349
RefSeq (protein)	NP_000619	n/a
Location (UCSC)	Chr 21: 33.27 – 33.31 Mb	Chr 16: 91.2 – 91.22 Mb
PubMed search
- Wikidata
View/Edit Human	View/Edit Mouse

Interleukin 10 receptor, beta subunit is a subunit for the interleukin-10 receptor. IL10RB is its human gene.

IL10RB has also been designated CDw210b (cluster of differentiation w210b).

The protein encoded by this gene belongs to the cytokine receptor family. It is an accessory chain essential for the active interleukin 10 receptor complex. Coexpression of this and IL10RA proteins has been shown to be required for IL10-induced signal transduction. This gene and three other interferon receptor genes, IFNAR2, IFNAR1, and IFNGR2, form a class II cytokine receptor gene cluster located in a small region on chromosome 21.
