= Interleukin-10 receptor =

Cell surface receptor for interleukin-10

interleukin 10 receptor, alpha

Identifiers
- Symbol: IL10RA
- Alt. symbols: IL10R
- NCBI gene: 3587
- HGNC: 5964
- OMIM: 146933
- RefSeq: NM_001558
- UniProt: Q13651

Other data
- Locus: Chr. 11 q23
Search for
- Structures: Swiss-model
- Domains: InterPro

interleukin 10 receptor, beta

Identifiers
- Symbol: IL10RB
- Alt. symbols: CRFB4, D21S58, D21S66
- NCBI gene: 3588
- HGNC: 5965
- OMIM: 123889
- RefSeq: NM_000628
- UniProt: Q08334

Other data
- Locus: Chr. 21 q22.1-22.2
Search for
- Structures: Swiss-model
- Domains: InterPro

Interleukin-10 receptor (IL-10R) is a type II cytokine receptor. The receptor is tetrameric, composed of 2α and 2β subunits. The α subunit (encoded in the Il10ra gene) is expressed on haematopoietic cells (such as T, B, NK, mast, and dendritic cells) whilst the β subunit (encoded in the Il10rb gene) is expressed ubiquitously. The α subunit is exclusive to interleukin-10, however the β subunit is shared with other type II cytokine receptors such as IL-22R, IL-26R and INFλR.

The IL-10Rα subunit acts as the ligand binding site and may be upregulated in various cell types as necessary. The IL-10Rβ functions as the signaling subunit and is constitutively expressed in a majority of cell types. There is evidence that upon ligand binding at the α subunit, a conformational change occurs in the β subunit that allows it to additionally bind to IL-10. This structure forms a heterotetramer that leads to the signaling complex activation of JAK1 and TYK2 kinases. JAK1 associates with the α subunit, and TYK2 with the β subunit where they then phosphorylate portions of the α subunit. This recruits STAT3, which is additionally phosphorylated by JAK1 and TYK2. STAT3 homodimerizes, moves to the cellular nucleus, and activates gene transcription.

The Interleukin-10 receptor is implicated in regulation of gastro-intestinal immune response, primarily in the mucosal layer. Murine studies of test subjects lacking functional receptors showed rapid onset of bowel inflammatory disorders. In human studies, the early onset of irritable bowel disease has been correlated with defects in the IL-10R subunits. Cases involving both the α and β subunits were identified, some possessing fully dysfunctional receptors, and others being incapable of accepting phosphorylation.
