= Interferon lambda 4 =

Protein-coding gene in the species Homo sapiens

IFNL4

Identifiers
- Aliases: IFNL4, IFNAN, interferon, lambda 4 (gene/pseudogene), interferon lambda 4 (gene/pseudogene)
- External IDs: OMIM: 615090; GeneCards: IFNL4

Gene location (Human)
Chr.	Chromosome 19 (human)
Band	19q13.2	Start	39,246,314 bp
Band	19q13.2	End	39,248,856 bp
RNA expression pattern
Bgee	Human / Mouse (ortholog); Top expressed in: testicle; gonad; prefrontal cortex; superior frontal gyrus; hypothalamus; substantia nigra; anterior cingulate cortex; temporal lobe; amygdala; hippocampus proper / n/a; More reference expression data
BioGPS	n/a
Gene ontology
Molecular function	cytokine activity; signaling receptor binding
Cellular component	cytoplasm; extracellular region; extracellular space
Biological process	innate immune response; positive regulation of immune response; regulation of T cell activation; receptor signaling pathway via JAK-STAT; defense response to virus; tyrosine phosphorylation of STAT protein; regulation of signaling receptor activity
Sources:Amigo / QuickGO
Orthologs
Databases	NCBI: entry; OMA: entry
Species	Human	Mouse
Entrez	101180976	n/a
Ensembl	ENSG00000272395	n/a
UniProt	K9M1U5	n/a
RefSeq (mRNA)	NM_001276254	n/a
RefSeq (protein)	NP_001263183	n/a
Location (UCSC)	Chr 19: 39.25 – 39.25 Mb	n/a
PubMed search		n/a
- Wikidata
View/Edit Human

Interferon lambda 4 (gene symbol: IFNL4) is one of the most recently discovered human genes and the newest addition to the interferon lambda protein family. This gene encodes the IFNL4 protein, which is involved in immune response to viral infection.

IFNL4 is similar to three neighboring genes (IFNL1, IFNL2 and IFNL3) in that proteins encoded by these genes bind to a shared co-receptor complex. Formation of this complex leads to activation of the JAK-STAT signalling pathway and upregulation of numerous interferon-stimulated genes. Genetics variants within or near this gene have been linked to clearance of hepatitis C virus (HCV) infection and other phenotypes.

== Discovery ==
The first three interferon lambda genes were discovered in 2003 by two independent research groups that used different nomenclatures in their reports. In 2013, Prokunina-Olsson et al. reported the presence of a fourth gene in this region, which they discovered after treating human hepatocytes with polyinosinic:polycytidylic acid (poly I:C) to simulate HCV infection and induce expression of interferon lambda genes. RNA sequencing revealed the presence of IFNL4, which had been overlooked previously, in the interferon lambda region.

In 2003, the Human Genome Organization Gene Nomenclature Committee (HUGO NC) had designated the first three genes found in this region as interleukins, but HUGO NC reconsidered that decision upon discovery of the fourth gene ten years later. Today, these four genes are recognized as interferon lambda genes, with official symbols of IFNL1 (formerly IL29), IFNL2 (formerly IL28A), IFNL3 (formerly IL28B) and IFNL4.

== Structure ==
The interferon lambda genes lie in the 19q13.13 chromosomal region. IFNL4 is located between IFNL3 and IFNL2. The IFNL4 gene contains five exons and the full IFNL4 protein consists of 179 amino acids.

The proteins encoded by the IFNL1, IFNL2, and IFNL3 genes have high amino-acid sequence similarity. IFNL2 and IFNL3 share ~96% amino-acid identity, and IFNL1 shares ~81% identity with IFNL2 and IFNL3. IFNL4 differs considerably from other members of this family. IFNL4 is most closely related to IFNL3, however, these proteins share only ~30% amino-acid identity. Similarity between IFNL3 and IFNL4 is greatest for the A and F helices, where lambda interferons interact with the IFNLR1 receptor, and least in the D helix, where they interact with IL10R2, the second component of the interferon lambda receptor complex.

=== Genetic variants ===
In 2009 (i.e., before the discovery of IFNL4), results from genome wide association studies (GWAS) indicated that single nucleotide polymorphisms (SNPs) near IFNL3 (rs12979860, rs8099917, and others) strongly associated with response to pegylated interferon-α and ribavirin treatment and spontaneous clearance of hepatitis C virus (HCV) infection.

As the gene then known as IL28B was the closest known gene at the time, these genetic variants were called 'IL28B variants' and it was assumed that the observed associations reflected differences in the structure or regulation of that gene. However, discovery of IFNL4 revealed many of these variants to be within or nearest to IFNL4. The rs12979860 SNP is located within intron 1 of IFNL4, while rs8099917 lies in an intergenic region, but nearest to IFNL4.

IFNL4 contains a polymorphism that controls the generation of the IFNL4 protein. The IFNL4-ΔG/TT (rs368234815, previously ss469415590) dinucleotide variant is composed of the rs11322783 (Δ/T) and rs74597329 (G/T) SNPs. Because those SNPs are in full linkage disequilibrium, rs368234815, rs11322783 and rs74597329 all provide the same information. In the NCBI dbSNP database, rs368234815 been merged into rs11322783. In the Genome Aggregation Database, however, IFNL4-ΔG/TT is represented by rs74597329. IFNL4-ΔG generates the complete IFNL4 protein while IFNL4-TT results in a frameshift that prematurely terminates the protein, producing truncated polypeptides without known biological function.

Another functional polymorphism within IFNL4 alters the protein's biological function. A non-synonymous variant located in exon 2 (rs117648444) substitutes a serine for a proline at amino acid position 70 (P70S) when present on a haplotype that includes the IFNL4-ΔG allele. In vitro studies have demonstrated the IFNL4 S70 protein has weaker biological function than IFNL4 P70. Specifically, IFNL4 S70 produced lower levels of interferon-stimulated gene expression and less antiviral activity compared to IFNL4 P70.

== Population genetics ==
Although the IFNL4 gene is present in all primates (and most non-primate mammals except mice or rats), humans are the only species in which the allele that abrogates IFNL4 has been found.

The chromosomal region containing IFNL4 has undergone the strongest selection of any region that harbors an interferon gene. Specifically, there has been very strong evolutionary selection for the IFNL4-TT variant, which 'knocks out' production of the IFNL4 protein. This allele likely arose just before the out-of-Africa migration and underwent immediate selection in the African population. That selection strengthened in European and Asian populations. As a result, whereas ~95% of individuals of African ancestry carry at least one copy of the IFNL4-ΔG allele and are able to produce IFNL4, that percentage drops to ~50% in Europeans and <15% in Asians. Comparison of African and East Asian populations revealed the IFNL4-TT allele to be among the most differentiated variants genome-wide.

It is unlikely HCV infection exerted the selection pressure that created these striking differences, as HCV did not become common until the twentieth century, and chronic HCV infection has too long of a course to majorly impact reproduction.

There is high linkage disequilibrium between the IFNL4-ΔG/TT variant and the rs12979860 and rs8099917 SNPs. Linkage disequilibrium between IFNL4-ΔG/TT and IFNL4 rs12979860 is complete in Asian populations (r^{2}=1.0) and strong among those of European (r^{2}>0.9), but weaker in African populations (r^{2}~0.7). For rs8099917, linkage disequilibrium with IFNL4-ΔG/TT is strong in Asian populations, moderate in Europeans, and weak in Africans.

The IFNL4-ΔG/TT and rs117648444 variants present in three observed haplotypes that can modify or abrogate the IFNL4 protein. These haplotypes are: IFNL4-ΔG: rs117648444-G, which creates the IFNL4 P70 protein; IFNL4-ΔG: rs117648444-A, which creates the IFNL4 S70 protein; IFNL4-TT: rs117648444-G, which does not generate a full IFNL4 protein.

== Associated phenotypes ==
IFNL4 genetic variants are associated with a variety of phenotypes, including immune response to HCV infection, selection for HCV variants, hepatic inflammation and fibrosis, as well as certain opportunistic viral infections, and cancers.

=== HCV clearance ===
Genotype for the IFNL4-ΔG/TT variant (and SNPs in linkage disequilibrium with that polymorphism) associate with both spontaneous clearance of HCV infection and successful treatment of chronic hepatitis C.

Interferon lambda became a focus of HCV research when studies associated the rs12979860 and rs8099917 SNPs with response to pegylated interferon-α and ribavirin treatment for chronic hepatitis C, and spontaneous HCV clearance. Compared to populations of European or Asian ancestry, African American populations demonstrated a lower frequency of the rs12979860-CC genotype, which is associated with viral clearance. That observation provided an explanation for previously observed racial differences in HCV treatment response and spontaneous clearance. The demonstrated association between genotype for the rs12979860 SNP and treatment led the US Food and Drug Administration to recommend testing for "IL28B" in clinical trials for new HCV treatments. Studies have been predominantly conducted on HCV genotype 1, but the association between IFNL4 genotype and impaired HCV clearance has been observed for other HCV genotypes as well.

IFNL4-ΔG/TT is the likely primary functional variant that accounts for this association. High linkage disequilibrium between marker SNPs (e.g., rs12979860) and candidate explanatory genetic variants (e.g., IFNL4-ΔG/TT) present a challenge in identifying functional polymorphisms. However, weaker linkage disequilibrium between IFNL4-ΔG/TT and IFNL4 rs12979860 in populations of African ancestry facilitate comparison of those polymorphisms, and in African American populations IFNL4-ΔG/TT was shown to be a better predictor than rs12979860 for response to treatment with pegylated interferon-α/ribavirin therapy and spontaneous HCV clearance. These findings were confirmed in a larger study of spontaneous clearance in an African American population and extended to European populations.

Associations between HCV clearance and genotype for the IFNL4-ΔG/TT polymorphism are strong. Among patients enrolled in the Virahep-C Trial, odds ratios for achieving a sustained virological response after treatment pegylated-interferon alpha/ribavirin (IFNL4-TT/TT versus IFNL4- ΔG/ΔG) were 2.90 in African-Americans and 4.42 in European-Americans. In the HALT-C cohort, even larger odds ratios were observed for sustained virological response: 11.0 and 6.94 among African-Americans and European-Americans, respectively.

Haplotypes that include the SNP (rs117648444), which controls the IFNL4 P70S protein variant, also associate with HCV clearance. In population studies, the variant that creates IFNL4 S70 associates with increased rates of spontaneous HCV clearance and better treatment response. In in vitro studies, the derived IFNL4 S70 protein produces reduced intrahepatic interferon stimulating gene expression and antiviral activity relative to IFNL4 P70. These results provide additional evidence that reduced IFNL4 activity improves HCV clearance.

=== Selection for HCV variants ===
IFNL4 genotype may affect the HCV genome by selecting for certain viral strains, including those that lead to resistance to treatment. A genome-to-genome analysis revealed IFNL4 rs12979860 to be associated with variation for many amino acids in the HCV genome. HCV-infected patients with the rs12979860-CC genotype (i.e., those who do not generate the IFNL4 protein) had a higher frequency of non-synonymous HCV variants than patients with non-CC genotypes.

Certain direct acting antiviral agents (DAAs) used to treat HCV infection target the HCV NS5A protein. HCV variants in which histidine is substituted for tyrosine at amino acid position 93 (NS5A Y93H) may cause resistance to those agents and decrease treatment success. Patients with the NS5A Y93H variant are less likely to respond to NS5A inhibitors such as daclatasvir, ledipasvir and ombitasvir, which are commonly used in popular DAA regimens (e.g., Harvoni). Patients with the IFNL4-TT/TT genotype were shown to have a higher frequency of the NS5A Y93H substitution than those who carried the ΔG allele. Consistent with those results, the IFNL4 rs12979860-C/C genotype was strongly shown to be associated with the prevalence of the Y93H variant in patients infected with HCV genotype 1b.

=== Hepatic inflammation and fibrosis ===
IFNL4 genotypes associated with increased HCV clearance and treatment response have also been linked to increased hepatic inflammation and fibrosis progression, which can lead to development of cirrhosis and liver cancer.

The rs8099917-G allele, which is in high linkage disequilibrium with IFNL4-ΔG and associates with reduced HCV clearance, has been associated with decreased necroinflammation, fibrosis and fibrosis progression. Consistent with that finding, individuals with chronic hepatitis C and the rs12979860-CC genotype tended to display higher portal inflammation, although analysis of paired biopsy results did not reveal associations between this genotype and fibrosis progression. Extending those findings, rs12979860-CC genotype was shown to be associated with increased inflammation and fibrosis not only in chronic HCV patients, but also in those with chronic hepatitis B or nonalcoholic fatty liver disease.

Like with HCV, linkage disequilibrium poses a challenge in identifying the functional polymorphism for these associations. In a study of HCV-infected African Americans and European ancestry patients undergoing liver transplantation, donor genotype for IFNL4-ΔG/TT was a stronger predictor of post-transplant fibrosis progression than genotype for rs12979860. However, in a second study on patients of European ancestry with chronic hepatitis C, linkage disequilibrium between IFNL4-ΔG/TT, IFNL4 rs12979860 and another variant in IFNL3 3' untranslated region (rs4803217) was too strong to discern genotype differences for hepatic inflammation and fibrosis. In contrast to results from studies of HCV clearance, no differences between genotypes that generated different variants of the IFNL4 protein (IFNL4 P70S) were found for either fibrosis or inflammation.

=== Risk of cancer ===
GWAS have been conducted for a large range of malignancies. However, a GWAS association between IFNL4 genotype and cancer is limited to risk of a rare subtype of ovarian cancer. GWAS performed by an international consortium revealed the IFNL4-ΔG allele, which generates the IFNL4 protein, was associated with a decreased risk of mucinous ovarian carcinoma. The explanation for this association remains to be determined.

In a candidate gene studies, associations with IFNL4 genotype have been reported for prostate cancer and Kaposi's sarcoma. IFNL4-ΔG associated with an increased risk of prostate cancer among men with sexually transmitted infections. In a Swiss cohort, men who carried the rs8099917-G allele, which is in linkage disequilibrium with IFNL4-ΔG in European populations, had an increased risk of Kaposi's sarcoma.

=== Other infections ===
Studies on IFNL4 variants and other infectious diseases have yielded mixed results. In a European population, individuals who carry the IFNL4 rs12979860-T allele (and therefore generate IFNL4 protein) were found to have more episodes of severe herpes labialis, which is caused by the herpes simplex virus. However, in a large cohort of HIV-infected women, genotype for the IFNL4-ΔG/TT polymorphism was not associated with herpes simplex virus-related outcomes, including episodes of oral or genital herpes. Human cytomegalovirus (human betaherpesvirus 5) infection can be reactivated in patients who become immunocompromised after organ transplantation or due to advanced HIV infection. Homozygosity for IFNL4-ΔG has been linked to increased risk for cytomegalovirus retinitis in HIV patients. Additionally, the IFNL4-ΔG allele has been associated with both higher rates of cytomegalovirus replication and more symptoms due to cytomegalovirus infection in both solid-organ and stem cell transplant patients.

== Function ==
Interferon lambda proteins are signaling proteins involved in immune response to viral infection. These proteins are classified as type-III interferons because they use the IFNLR1 and IL10R2 receptors for signaling. Signaling initiated by IFNL or IFN-α triggers the JAK-STAT pathway, leading to the expression of numerous interferon-stimulated genes with anti-viral and anti-proliferative effects.

In contrast to the ubiquitous expression of receptors for IFN-α, IFNLR1 is largely restricted to tissues of epithelial origin. Therefore, interferon lambda proteins may have evolved specifically to protect the epithelium. In vitro studies have revealed that interferon-stimulated gene expression and anti-viral activity induced by recombinant IFNL4 are comparable to that induced by IFNL3, however, the antiviral effects of IFNL4 have faster onset than those produced by other members of the interferon lambda family.

Because interferons are generally considered to be antiviral cytokines and IFNL4 has demonstrated such anti-viral properties, it seems paradoxical that producing IFNL4 protein is linked to impaired clearance of HCV. The explanation for this paradox is not fully understood.

Higher interferon stimulated gene expression associated with IFNL4 indicate that this protein does have in vivo antiviral effects, but, at least for HCV infection, other manifestations seem to override those influences. While most interferon stimulated genes have antiviral effects, some may enhance viral replication. IFNL4 induces expression of USP18 and ISG15, which interfere with the function of IFN-α, although it is not clear that this occurs in vivo during HCV infection. SOCS1, another negative regulator of the immune response to viral infections, may also be induced by IFNL4. It is possible that IFNL4 interferes with the antiviral activity of other interferons. There is evidence that IFNL4 desensitizes the response to IFN-α treatment in chronic hepatitis C through long-term induction of negative regulators of the interferon response and that IFNL4 acts faster than other type III IFNs in inducing such genes.

The ability to produce IFNL4 (i.e., carriage of IFNL4 rs12979860 CT or TT genotype), in addition to male gender, absent/mild steatosis, and lower viral load, augments antibody levels against HCV, which indicates that IFNL4 may be associated with T helper cell 2 (Th2) immune skewing.

== Research ==
Prior to the discovery of IFNL4, genotype for the rs12979860 SNP was used to predict response of HCV-infected patients to treatment with pegylated interferon-α/ribavirin therapy. Newer regimens based on combinations of DAAs are much more effective than pegylated interferon-α/ribavirin and testing for IFNL4 genotype is not currently recommended for those regimens. However, DAA regimens remain expensive. It could be cost effective to use IFNL4 genotype to predict response to shorter than standard duration treatment. Treatment duration could be personalized for individual patients or populations, such as for East Asians, who have a high frequency of the IFNL4-TT/TT genotype.

Recent studies, primarily in mouse models, have demonstrated that other members of the interferon lambda family provide tissue barrier protection against a wide range of viral pathogens, including neuroinvasive West Nile virus infection, respiratory infections including influenza and gastrointestinal viruses such as norovirus and rotavirus. Given the strong evolutionary selection against the IFNL4 protein-generating IFNL4-ΔG allele, genotype for the IFNL4-ΔG/TT variant may play an important role in other infectious diseases, therefore, future epidemiological studies should examine those relationships.

Interferons are generally considered to be anti-viral cytokines that are generated in response to viral invasion. Results from studies of IFNL4 variants challenge that paradigm. IFNL4 has anti-viral properties in vitro, yet individuals who cannot generate this protein (homozygous for IFNL4-TT), are more likely to clear infection with HCV. Furthermore, nonalcoholic fatty liver disease is not caused by a viral infection, so this condition would not be expected to induce expression of interferons. Unexpectedly, IFNL4 genotype affects the development of hepatic inflammation and fibrosis in patients with nonalcoholic fatty liver disease. Future research aimed at understanding these paradoxes may further our understanding of interferon biology.
