= Interferon type III =

Group of anti-viral cytokines

Interferon type III (λ)

Identifiers
- Symbol: IL28A
- Pfam: PF15177
- InterPro: IPR029177
- CATH: 3og6A00
Available protein structures:
- PDB: IPR029177 PF15177 (ECOD; PDBsum)
- AlphaFold: IPR029177; PF15177

The type III interferon group is a group of anti-viral cytokines that in humans consists of a singular family, IFN-λ (lambda). Their function is similar to that of type I interferons, but is less intense and serves mostly as a first-line defense against viruses in the epithelium.

In humans, the IFN-λs are IFN-λ1, IFN-λ2, IFN-λ3, and IFN-λ4. The first three used to be known as IL29, IL28A, and IL28B respectively. They were discovered in 2003.

IFN-λ2 and IFN-λ3 plays a role in immune defense against viruses, including the induction of an "antiviral state" by turning on Mx proteins, 2',5'-oligoadenylate synthetase as well as ISGF3G (Interferon Stimulated Gene Factor 3).

== Discovery ==
IFN-λ1, λ2, λ3 were discovered along with their receptor in 2002 by ZymoGenetics using a genomic screening process in which the entire human genome was scanned for putative genes. Once these genes were found, a second scan was performed to look specifically for cytokines.

The discovery of the much more divergent IFN-λ4 was facilitated by a number of genome-wide association studies (GWAS)finding several single-nucleotide polymorphisms in the area being associated with hepatitis C outcomes. It was originally thought that these variants had something to do with IFN-λ3 as the closest known gene in the area was INFL3. In 2013, when sequencing the RNA of poly-I:C (a double-stranded RNA, used to mimic infection) treated primary human hepatocytes, Prokunina-Olsson et al. unexpectedly found that the region upstream of INFL3 previously highlighted by GWAS produced an mRNA. Furthermore, the rs368234815 variant was predicted to cause a frameshift mutation in the mRNA, which is consistent with its high impact. Further biochemical characterization confirmed the existence of such a protein and the INFL4 gene.

== Genomic location ==
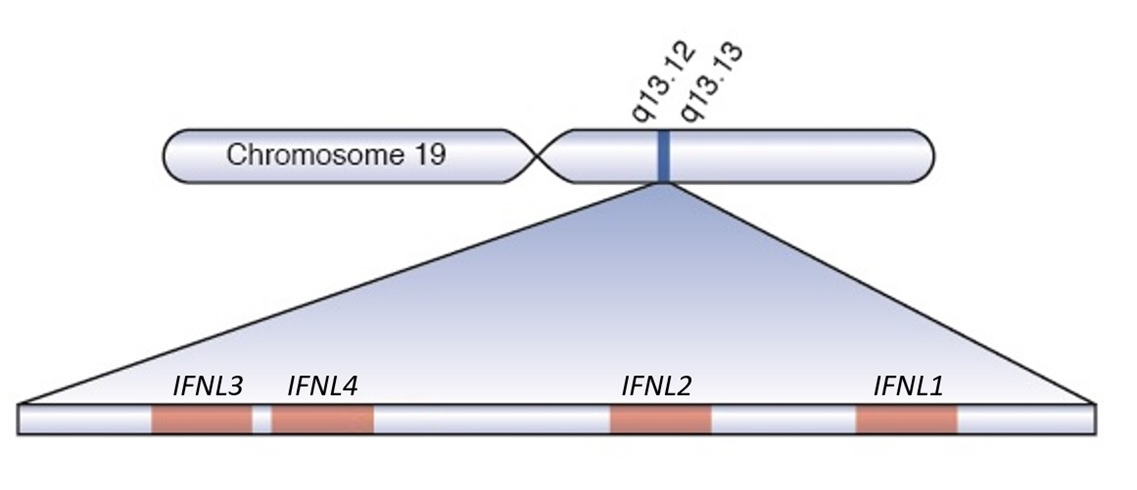
Type III interferon (interferon lambda) genes on human chromosome 19

Genes encoding this group of interferons are all located on the long arm of chromosome 19 in humans, specifically in region between 19q13.12 and 19q13.13. IFNL1 gene is located downstream of IFNL2 on the forward strand. IFNL3 is located downstream of IFNL4 on the reverse strand.

In mice, the genes encoding for type III interferons are located on chromosome 7 and the family consists only of IFN-λ2 and IFN-λ3.

Interleukin 28A

Identifiers
- Symbol: IL28A
- Alt. symbols: IFNL2
- NCBI gene: 282616
- HGNC: 18364
- OMIM: 607401
- RefSeq: NM_172138
- UniProt: Q8IZJ0

Other data
- Locus: Chr. 19 q13.13
Search for
- Structures: Swiss-model
- Domains: InterPro

Interleukin 28B

Identifiers
- Symbol: IL28B
- Alt. symbols: IFNL3
- NCBI gene: 282617
- HGNC: 18365
- OMIM: 607402
- RefSeq: NM_172139
- UniProt: Q8IZI9

Other data
- Locus: Chr. 19 q13.13
Search for
- Structures: Swiss-model
- Domains: InterPro

== Structure ==
=== Gene ===
Unlike type I interferon group, which consist of only one exon, type III interferons consist of multiple exons.

=== Protein ===
All interferon groups belong to class II cytokine family which have a conserved structure that comprises six α-helices. IFN-λ1,2,3 are highly similar to each other while IFN-λ4 stands as an outlier:

Percent identity matrix of human IFN-λ (preprotein and mature chain)
	IFNL1	IFNL2	IFNL3	INFL4
INFL1	100	74.42	76.16	28.95
INFL2	72.25	100	96.00	27.92
INFL3	73.30	95.92	100	27.92
INFL4	28.65	26.86	27.01	100

The lower half of the diagonal is for the translated preprotein and the upper half is for the released chain, both as annotated on UniProt.

== Function ==
Functions of type III interferons overlap largely with that of type I interferons. Both of these cytokine groups modulate the immune response after a pathogen has been sensed in the organism, their functions are mostly anti-viral and anti-proliferative. However, type III interferons tend to be less inflammatory and show a slower kinetics than type I. Also, because of the restricted expression of IFNLR1, the immunomodulatory effect of type III interferons is limited.

Because the receptors for type I and type II interferons are expressed on almost all nucleated cells, their function is rather systemic. Type III interferon receptors are expressed more specifically on epithelial cells and some immune cells such as neutrophils, and depending on the species, B cells and dendritic cells as well. Therefore, their antiviral effects are most prominent in barriers, in gastrointestinal, respiratory and reproductive tracts. Type III interferons usually act as the first line of defense against viruses at the barriers.

In the gastrointestinal tract, both type I and type III interferons are needed to effectively fight reovirus infection. Type III interferons restrict the initial replication of the virus and diminish the shedding of through feces, while type I interferons prevent the systematic infection. On the other hand, in the respiratory tract these two groups of interferons seem to be rather redundant, as documented by the susceptibility of double-deficient mice (in receptors for type I and type III interferons), but the resistance to respiratory virus in mice that are deficient in either type I or type III interferon receptors. Additional gastrointestinal viruses such as rotavirus and norovirus, as well as non-gastrointestinal viruses like influenza and West Nile virus, are also restricted by type III interferons.

== Receptor ==
This group of cytokines share a heterodimeric receptor. The receptors have two type III fibronectin domains in their extracellular domain. The interface of these two domains forms the cytokine binding site. The receptor complex for type III interferons consists of two subunits - IL10RB (also called IL10R2 or CRF2-4) and IFNLR1 (formerly called IL28RA, CRF2-12).

In contrast to the ubiquitous expression of receptors for type I interferons, IFNLR1 is largely restricted to tissues of epithelial origin. Despite high homology between type III interferons, the binding affinity to IFNLR1 differ, with IFN-λ1 showing the highest binding affinity, and IFN-λ3 showing the lowest binding affinity.

== Signalling pathway ==
IFN-λ production is induced by pathogen sensing through pattern recognition receptors (PRR), including TLR, Ku70 and RIG-I-like. The main producer of IFN-λ are type 2 myeloid dendritic cells.

IFN-λ binds to IFNLR1 with a high affinity, which then recruits the low-affinity subunit of the receptor, IL10Rb. This interaction creates a signalling complex. Upon binding of the cytokine to the receptor, JAK-STAT signalling pathway gets activated, specifically JAK1 and TYK2 and phosphorylate and activate STAT-1 and STAT-2, which then induces downstream signalling that leads to induction of expression of hundreds of IFN-stimulated genes (ISG), e.g.: NF-κB, IRF, ISRE, Mx1, OAS1.

The signalling is modulated by suppressor of cytokine signalling 1 (SOCS1) and ubiquitin-specific peptidase 18 (USP18).

== Biotechnology ==
IFN-λ is a potential immunologic adjuvant.

Experimental use of IFN-λ3 in a small animal H1N1 vaccine lead to augmented antigen-specific Interferon Gamma release as well as an increased cytotoxic potential in CD8+ T cells. The protection rate increased from 50% to 100%. Similar results were seen in a primate model for HIV vaccine research.

== Clinical relevance ==
As mentioned before, a number of mutations that prevent the production of functional IFNL4 was found to be associated with success treatment of HCV.
