= Type II cytokine receptor =

Transmembrane proteins

Identifiers
- Symbol: Type II cytokine receptor
- Membranome: 1030

Interferon gamma receptor

Identifiers
- Symbol: IFNGR1
- Pfam: PF07140
- InterPro: IPR021126
- SCOP2: 1fg9 / SCOPe / SUPFAM
Available protein structures:
- PDB: IPR021126 PF07140 (ECOD; PDBsum)
- AlphaFold: IPR021126; PF07140

Interferon-alpha/beta receptor, fibronectin type III

Identifiers
- Symbol: Interfer-bind
- Pfam: Interfer-bind
- InterPro: IPR015373
- SCOP2: 1n6u / SCOPe / SUPFAM
Available protein structures:
- PDB: IPR015373 Interfer-bind (ECOD; PDBsum)
- AlphaFold: IPR015373; Interfer-bind

Type II cytokine receptors, also commonly known as class II cytokine receptors, are transmembrane proteins that are expressed on the surface of certain cells. They bind and respond to the class II cytokines, which includes all types of interferons and members of the interleukin-10 family These receptors are characterized by the lack of a WSXWS motif which differentiates them from type I cytokine receptors.

In the context of fish and animals further removed from humans, the family is also called cytokine receptor family B (CRFB).

== Structure ==
Type II cytokine receptors are related predominantly by sequence similarities in their extracellular portions that are composed of tandem Ig-like (FN3) domains. The structures for the extracellular domains of the receptors for interferon types, I, II, and III are all known. Type II cytokine receptors are tyrosine-kinase-linked receptors. The intracellular domain of type II cytokine receptors is typically associated with a tyrosine kinase belonging to the Janus kinase (JAK family). Binding of the receptor typically leads to activation of the canonical JAK/STAT signaling pathway.

Like other cytokine receptors, many type II CRs are heterodimers or multimers with a high and a low affinity component. The high-affinity component is cytokine‐specific and, again like other CRs, is often the α chain. The low-affinity component remains required for forming a functional complex: in some examples such as IFN III, the ligand first binds to the α chain, then the two molecules together recruits a "shared" β chain.

Typical CRFBs have an alpha chain and a beta chain. Each chain contains two (except for IFNAR1) N-terminal extracellular ligand-binding fibronectin type III domains (FN3; each pair is called a cytokine homology region, CHR), then extends intracellularly. Unlike class I CRs, all chains (even alpha) bind a kinase to participate in signaling. The shorter one (<100 intracellular residues, usually α) typically binds either JAK2 or TYK2, and the longer one typically interacts with JAK1. Interaction with JAK1 is mediated by a conserved motif PxxLxF (box1). There is a neighboring box2 that by itself poorly binds JAK1, but improves the binding between box1 and JAK1 in vitro. C-terminal to the two kinase boxes, mainly on the "long" chain, is a disordered region that binds STAT. TYK2 binding is greatly dependent on box2.

There are many variations on the theme among the type II receptors, including a high-affinity β chain, some non-shared chains, and doubled stoichiometry where the complex is a heterotetramer assembled on binding a heterodimer cytokine (IFN II and IL-10 family members).

== Types ==
Type II cytokine receptors include those that bind interferons and those that bind members of the interleukin-10 family (interleukin-10, interleukin-20, interleukin-22, and interleukin-28). Expression of specific receptor varieties is highly variable across tissue types with some receptors being ubiquitously expressed and some receptors only expressed in specific tissues.

Some combinations of human type II cytokine receptors
Short name	Cytokines	High-affinity	Low-affinity	Kinase (Hi, Lo)	STAT	SOCS	Notes
IFN I R	IFN-αβεκω	IFNAR2	IFNAR1	JAK1, TYK2	Stat1, Stat2 → IRF9	SOCS1	IFNAR1 has two CHRs.
IFN II R	IFN-γ	IFNGR1	IFNGR2	JAK1, JAK2	Stat1	SOCS1	Doubled.
IFN III R IL-28R	IFN-λ	IFNLR1	IL10RB	TYK2, JAK1	Stat1, Stat2 → IRF9	SOCS1	
IL-10R	IL-10	IL10RA	IL10RB	TYK2, JAK1	Stat3, Stat1, Stat5	?	Doubled.
IL-20R, II	IL-19/20/24	IL20RB	IL20RA	TYK2, JAK1	Stat3, Stat5	?	β is high-affinity.
IL-20R, I	IL-20/24	IL22R	IL20RB	TYK2, JAK1	Stat3, Stat5	?	
IL-22R	IL-22	IL22R	IL10RB	TYK2, JAK1	Stat3, Stat1, Stat5	?	May recruit IL-22BP (antagonist).
IL-26R	IL-26	IL20RA	IL10RB	TYK2, JAK1	Stat3, Stat1	?	Likely doubled.

=== Interferon receptors ===
The interferon receptor is a molecule displayed on the surface of cells which interacts with extracellular interferons. Class II cytokine receptors bind type I, type II, and type III interferons. Type I interferons play important roles in both the adaptive and innate immune responses, prevent proliferation of pathogens, and have antiviral activities. Type II interferons help to modulate the immune system's response to pathogens, and these interferons also respond to pathogens. Type III interferons induce a similar response to type I interferons, but their expression is limited to epithelial cells. The receptor is coded for by number of different genes, due to the diversity of types of interferons. Regulation of cell surface receptor levels plays an important role in the regulation and limiting of interferon signaling.

- interferon-alpha/beta receptor
- interferon-gamma receptor
- Interferon type III receptor

=== Interleukin receptors ===
- Interleukin-10 receptor
- Interleukin-20 receptor
- Interleukin-22 receptor
- Interleukin-26 receptor
