= Interferon gamma receptor 1 =

Protein-coding gene in the species Homo sapiens

IFNGR1
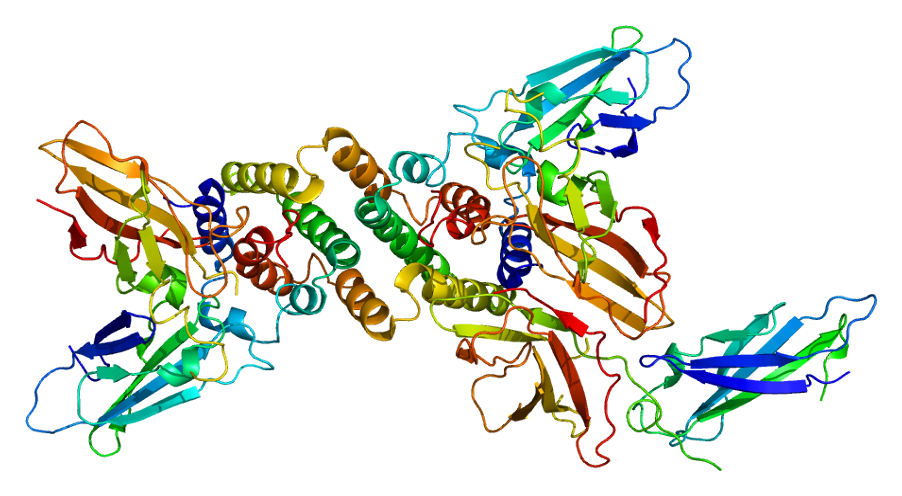

Identifiers
- Aliases: IFNGR1, CD119, IFNGR, IMD27A, IMD27B, interferon gamma receptor 1
- External IDs: OMIM: 107470; MGI: 107655; GeneCards: IFNGR1
Available structures
PDB	Ortholog search: PDBe RCSB
PDB	List of PDB id codes 1FG9, 1FYH, 1JRH

Gene location (Human)
Chr.	Chromosome 6 (human)
Band	6q23.3	Start	137,197,483 bp
Band	6q23.3	End	137,219,449 bp

Gene location (Mouse)
Chr.	Chromosome 10 (mouse)
Band	10 A3|10 8.49 cM	Start	19,467,697 bp
Band	10 A3|10 8.49 cM	End	19,485,977 bp
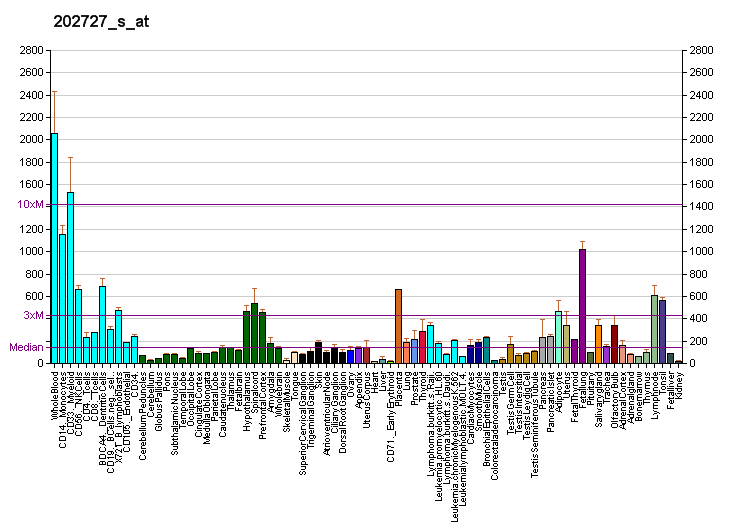

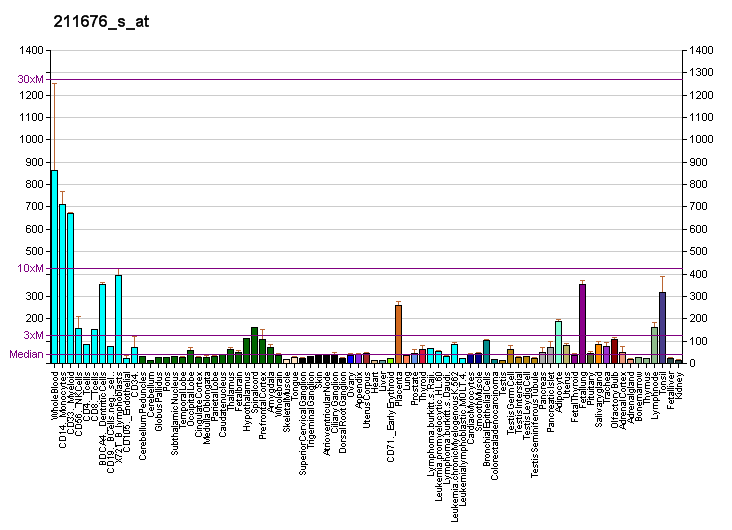
RNA expression pattern
Bgee	Human / Mouse (ortholog); Top expressed in: lower lobe of lung; epithelium of nasopharynx; right lung; jejunal mucosa; pericardium; human penis; palpebral conjunctiva; skin of hip; monocyte; upper lobe of lung / Top expressed in: lower jaw; Meckel's cartilage; mandibular molars; thymus; left colon; granulocyte; myometrium; duodenum; tibiofemoral joint; lip; More reference expression data
BioGPS	More reference expression data
Gene ontology
Molecular function	interferon-gamma receptor activity; protein binding; cytokine binding; cytokine receptor activity
Cellular component	integral component of membrane; integral component of plasma membrane; membrane; plasma membrane
Biological process	response to virus; regulation of interferon-gamma-mediated signaling pathway; signal transduction; interferon-gamma-mediated signaling pathway; cytokine-mediated signaling pathway; microglial cell activation; positive regulation of gene expression; astrocyte activation; negative regulation of amyloid-beta clearance; positive regulation of amyloid-beta formation
Sources:Amigo / QuickGO
Orthologs
Databases	NCBI: entry; OMA: entry
Species	Human	Mouse
Entrez	3459	15979
Ensembl	ENSG00000027697	ENSMUSG00000020009
UniProt	P15260	P15261
RefSeq (mRNA)	NM_000416; NM_001363526; NM_001363527	NM_010511
RefSeq (protein)	NP_000407; NP_001350455; NP_001350456	NP_034641
Location (UCSC)	Chr 6: 137.2 – 137.22 Mb	Chr 10: 19.47 – 19.49 Mb
PubMed search
- Wikidata
View/Edit Human	View/Edit Mouse

Interferon gamma receptor 1 (IFNGR1) also known as CD119 (Cluster of Differentiation 119), is a protein that in humans is encoded by the IFNGR1 gene.

== Function ==
The gene IFNGR1 encodes IFN-γR1, which is the ligand-binding chain (alpha) of the heterodimeric gamma interferon receptor, which is found on macrophages. IFNGR2, encodes IFN-γR2, the non-ligand-binding partner of the heterodimeric receptor.

== Interactions ==
Interferon gamma receptor 1 has been shown to interact with Interferon-gamma.

== Mutations ==
Mutations in the IFNGR1 gene can lead to extreme susceptibility to Mycobacterial infections. All known mutations and common variations in the IFNGR1 are present in the IFNGR1 mutation database.

== See also ==
- Cluster of differentiation
- Interferon-gamma receptor
