= Interferon gamma receptor 2 =

Protein-coding gene in the species Homo sapiens

IFNGR2

Identifiers
- Aliases: IFNGR2, AF-1, IFGR2, IFNGT1, IMD28, interferon gamma receptor 2 (interferon gamma transducer 1), interferon gamma receptor 2
- External IDs: OMIM: 147569; MGI: 107654; GeneCards: IFNGR2

Gene location (Human)
Chr.	Chromosome 21 (human)
Band	21q22.11	Start	33,403,413 bp
Band	21q22.11	End	33,479,348 bp

Gene location (Mouse)
Chr.	Chromosome 16 (mouse)
Band	16 C3.3|16 53.07 cM	Start	91,343,960 bp
Band	16 C3.3|16 53.07 cM	End	91,362,511 bp
RNA expression pattern
Bgee	Human / Mouse (ortholog); Top expressed in: monocyte; blood; granulocyte; placenta; tibial nerve; appendix; rectum; gallbladder; spleen; subcutaneous adipose tissue / Top expressed in: interventricular septum; granulocyte; duodenum; cardiac muscles; myocardium of ventricle; right ventricle; temporal muscle; knee joint; muscle of thigh; triceps brachii muscle; More reference expression data
BioGPS	n/a
Gene ontology
Molecular function	interferon-gamma receptor activity; interleukin-10 receptor activity; cytokine receptor activity
Cellular component	integral component of plasma membrane; membrane; endoplasmic reticulum membrane; cytoplasmic vesicle; Golgi membrane; cytoplasmic vesicle membrane; cytoplasm; Golgi apparatus; integral component of membrane; plasma membrane; endoplasmic reticulum
Biological process	response to virus; cell surface receptor signaling pathway; regulation of interferon-gamma-mediated signaling pathway; interferon-gamma-mediated signaling pathway; cytokine-mediated signaling pathway
Sources:Amigo / QuickGO
Orthologs
Databases	NCBI: entry; OMA: entry
Species	Human	Mouse
Entrez	3460	15980
Ensembl	ENSG00000159128; ENSG00000262795	ENSMUSG00000022965
UniProt	P38484	n/a
RefSeq (mRNA)	NM_005534; NM_001329128	NM_008338
RefSeq (protein)	NP_001316057; NP_005525	n/a
Location (UCSC)	Chr 21: 33.4 – 33.48 Mb	Chr 16: 91.34 – 91.36 Mb
PubMed search
- Wikidata
View/Edit Human	View/Edit Mouse

Interferon gamma receptor 2 also known as IFN-γR2 is a protein which in humans is encoded by the IFNGR2 gene.

== Function ==
This gene (IFNGR2) encodes the non-ligand-binding beta chain of the gamma interferon receptor. Human interferon-gamma receptor is a multimer of two IFN-γR1 chains (encoded by IFNGR1) and two IFN-γR2 chains.

== Clinical significance ==
Defects in IFNGR2 are a cause of autosomal recessive mendelian susceptibility to mycobacterial disease (MSMD), also known as familial disseminated atypical mycobacterial infection. All known mutations in IFNGR2 are collected in the IFNGR2 mutation database.
