= Interferon gamma =

InterPro Family

IFNG
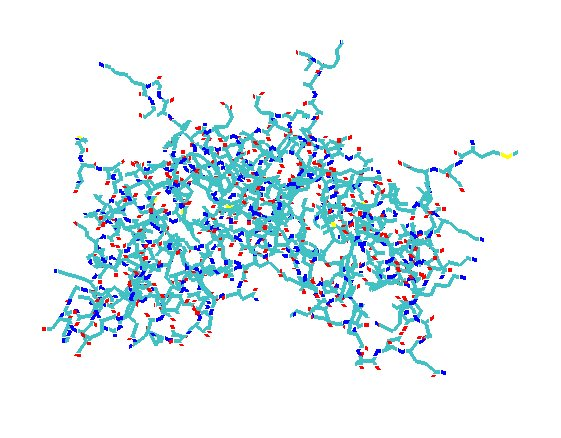

Identifiers
- Aliases: IFNG, IFG, IFI, interferon, gamma, interferon gamma, IMD69
- External IDs: OMIM: 147570; MGI: 107656; GeneCards: IFNG
Available structures
PDB	Ortholog search: PDBe RCSB
PDB	List of PDB id codes 1EKU, 1FG9, 1FYH, 1HIG, 3BES

Gene location (Human)
Chr.	Chromosome 12 (human)
Band	12q15	Start	68,154,768 bp
Band	12q15	End	68,159,740 bp

Gene location (Mouse)
Chr.	Chromosome 10 (mouse)
Band	10 D2|10 66.75 cM	Start	118,276,951 bp
Band	10 D2|10 66.75 cM	End	118,281,797 bp
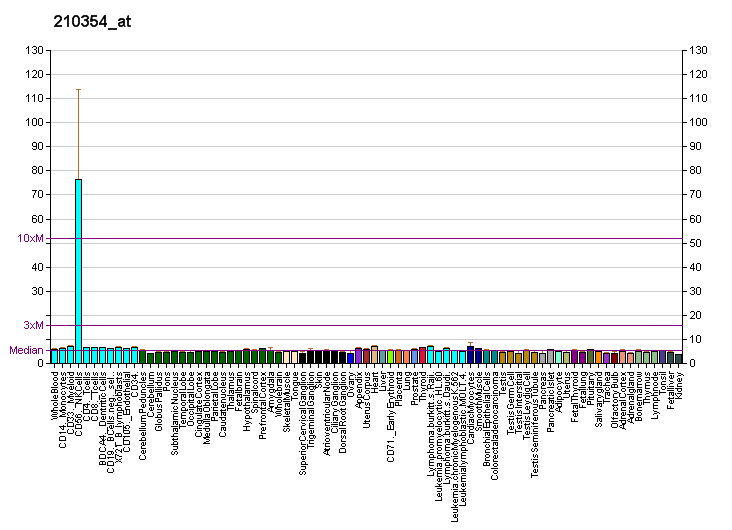
RNA expression pattern
Bgee	Human / Mouse (ortholog); Top expressed in: testicle; granulocyte; lymph node; bone marrow cell; appendix; tibialis anterior muscle; gallbladder; blood; spleen; right lobe of liver / Top expressed in: embryo; granulocyte; ileum; jejunum; bone marrow; spleen; thymus; duodenum; urinary bladder; thoracic segment of trunk; More reference expression data
BioGPS	More reference expression data
Gene ontology
Molecular function	interferon-gamma receptor binding; cytokine activity; protein binding
Cellular component	extracellular region; external side of plasma membrane; perikaryon; neuron projection; cytoplasm; extracellular space
Biological process	apoptotic process; positive regulation of MHC class II biosynthetic process; negative regulation of smooth muscle cell proliferation; cellular response to interleukin-18; antigen processing and presentation; positive regulation of fructose 1,6-bisphosphate 1-phosphatase activity; regulation of transcription, DNA-templated; positive regulation of tumor necrosis factor (ligand) superfamily member 11 production; positive regulation of interleukin-12 production; positive regulation of autophagy; positive regulation of smooth muscle cell apoptotic process; regulation of insulin secretion; extrinsic apoptotic signaling pathway; regulation of the force of heart contraction; regulation of neuronal action potential; positive regulation of nitric oxide biosynthetic process; positive regulation of synaptic transmission, cholinergic; response to virus; positive regulation of membrane protein ectodomain proteolysis; positive regulation of epithelial cell migration; positive regulation of osteoclast differentiation; positive regulation of killing of cells of other organism; positive regulation of calcidiol 1-monooxygenase activity; positive regulation of peptidyl-serine phosphorylation of STAT protein; negative regulation of transcription by RNA polymerase II; positive regulation of vitamin D biosynthetic process; neutrophil chemotaxis; negative regulation of gene expression; positive regulation of fructose 1,6-bisphosphate metabolic process; positive regulation of transcription, DNA-templated; endoplasmic reticulum unfolded protein response; cell surface receptor signaling pathway; positive regulation of gene expression; regulation of interferon-gamma-mediated signaling pathway; defense response to bacterium; defense response to virus; positive regulation of neuron differentiation; positive regulation of T cell proliferation; positive regulation of cell population proliferation; regulation of hepatocyte proliferation; immune response; regulation of immune response; positive regulation of tumor necrosis factor production; CD8-positive, alpha-beta T cell differentiation involved in immune response; neutrophil apoptotic process; sensory perception of mechanical stimulus; regulation of growth; positive regulation of isotype switching to IgG isotypes; positive regulation of exosomal secretion; positive regulation of CD4-positive, CD25-positive, alpha-beta regulatory T cell differentiation involved in immune response; negative regulation of interleukin-17 production; cellular response to lipopolysaccharide; T cell receptor signaling pathway; negative regulation of epithelial cell differentiation; negative regulation of myelination; inflammatory cell apoptotic process; positive regulation of interleukin-23 production; positive regulation of transcription by RNA polymerase II; negative regulation of cell population proliferation; defense response to protozoan; positive regulation of cell adhesion; negative regulation of glomerular mesangial cell proliferation; negative regulation of fibroblast proliferation; regulation of glial cell proliferation; positive regulation of apoptotic process; positive regulation of protein phosphorylation; adaptive immune response; humoral immune response; regulation of protein ADP-ribosylation; positive regulation of protein-containing complex assembly; positive regulation of tyrosine phosphorylation of STAT protein; negative regulation of transcription, DNA-templated; regulation of defense response to virus by host; interferon-gamma-mediated signaling pathway; positive regulation of protein serine/threonine kinase activity; positive regulation of protein deacetylation; positive regulation of core promoter binding; interleukin-12-mediated signaling pathway; regulation of regulatory T cell differentiation; positive regulation of protein localization to plasma membrane; regulation of signaling receptor activity; positive regulation of protein import into nucleus; microglial cell activation; positive regulation of NMDA glutamate receptor activity; receptor signaling pathway via JAK-STAT; positive regulation of glycolytic process; astrocyte activation; positive regulation of phagocytosis; positive regulation of neurogenesis; positive regulation of nitrogen compound metabolic process; positive regulation of nitric-oxide synthase biosynthetic process; neuroinflammatory response; negative regulation of amyloid-beta clearance; positive regulation of neuron death; positive regulation of cellular respiration; positive regulation of amyloid-beta formation; negative regulation of tau-protein kinase activity; positive regulation of iron ion import across plasma membrane
Sources:Amigo / QuickGO
Orthologs
Databases	NCBI: entry; OMA: entry
Species	Human	Mouse
Entrez	3458	15978
Ensembl	ENSG00000111537	ENSMUSG00000055170
UniProt	P01579	P01580
RefSeq (mRNA)	NM_000619	NM_008337
RefSeq (protein)	NP_000610	NP_032363
Location (UCSC)	Chr 12: 68.15 – 68.16 Mb	Chr 10: 118.28 – 118.28 Mb
PubMed search
- Wikidata
View/Edit Human	View/Edit Mouse

Interferon gamma
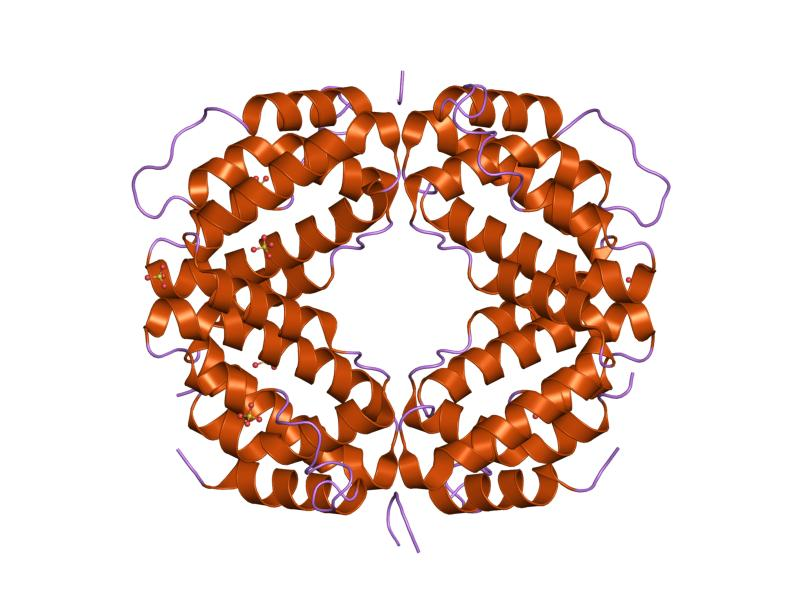
- Crystal structure of a biologically active single chain mutant of human interferon gamma

Identifiers
- Symbol: IFN gamma
- Pfam: PF00714
- Pfam clan: CL0053
- InterPro: IPR002069
- SCOP2: 1rfb / SCOPe / SUPFAM
Available protein structures:
- PDB: IPR002069 PF00714 (ECOD; PDBsum)
- AlphaFold: IPR002069; PF00714

Interferon gamma (IFN-γ) is a family of dimerized soluble cytokines in the type II class of interferons. In humans, IFN-γ is the only type II family and IFNG is the only IFN-γ gene.

Through cell signaling, interferon gamma plays a role in regulating the immune response of its target cell. A key signaling pathway that is activated by type II IFN is the JAK-STAT signaling pathway. IFNG plays an important role in both innate and adaptive immunity. Type II IFN is primarily secreted by CD4^{+} T helper 1 (Th1) cells, natural killer (NK) cells, and CD8^{+} cytotoxic T cells. The expression of type II IFN is upregulated and downregulated by cytokines. By activating signaling pathways in cells such as macrophages, B cells, and CD8^{+} cytotoxic T cells, it is able to promote inflammation, antiviral or antibacterial activity, and cell proliferation and differentiation. Type II IFN is serologically different from interferon type 1, binds to different receptors, and is encoded by a separate chromosomal locus. Type II IFN has played a role in the development of cancer immunotherapy treatments due to its ability to prevent tumor growth.

The existence of this interferon, which early in its history was known as the immune interferon, was described by E. F. Wheelock as a product of human leukocytes stimulated with phytohemagglutinin, and by others as a product of antigen-stimulated lymphocytes. It was also shown to be produced in human lymphocytes or tuberculin-sensitized mouse peritoneal lymphocytes challenged with Mantoux test (PPD); the resulting supernatants were shown to inhibit growth of vesicular stomatitis virus. Those reports also contained the basic observation underlying the now widely employed interferon gamma release assay used to test for tuberculosis.

== Function ==
IFNG, or type II interferon, is a cytokine that is critical for innate and adaptive immunity against viral, some bacterial and protozoan infections. IFNG is an important activator of macrophages and inducer of major histocompatibility complex class II molecule expression. Aberrant IFNG expression is associated with a number of autoinflammatory and autoimmune diseases. The importance of IFNG in the immune system stems in part from its ability to inhibit viral replication directly, and most importantly from its immunostimulatory and immunomodulatory effects. IFNG is produced predominantly by natural killer cells (NK) and natural killer T cells (NKT) as part of the innate immune response, and by CD4 Th1 and CD8 cytotoxic T lymphocyte (CTL) effector T cells once antigen-specific immunity develops as part of the adaptive immune response. IFNG is also produced by non-cytotoxic innate lymphoid cells (ILC), a family of immune cells first discovered in the early 2010s.

The primary cells that secrete type II IFN are CD4^{+} T helper 1 (Th1) cells, natural killer (NK) cells, and CD8^{+} cytotoxic T cells. It can also be secreted by antigen presenting cells (APCs) such as dendritic cells (DCs), macrophages (MΦs), and B cells to a lesser degree. Type II IFN expression is upregulated by the production of interleukin cytokines, such as IL-12, IL-15, IL-18, as well as type I interferons (IFN-α and IFN-β). Meanwhile, IL-4, IL-10, transforming growth factor-beta (TGF-β) and glucocorticoids are known to downregulate type II IFN expression.

Type II IFN is a cytokine, meaning it functions by signaling to other cells in the immune system and influencing their immune response. There are many immune cells type II IFN acts on. Some of its main functions are to induce IgG isotype switching in B cells; upregulate major histocompatibility complex (MHC) class II expression on APCs; induce CD8^{+} cytotoxic T cell differentiation, activation, and proliferation; and activate macrophages. In macrophages, type II IFN stimulates IL-12 expression. IL-12 in turn promotes the secretion of IFNG by NK cells and Th1 cells, and it signals naive T helper cells (Th0) to differentiate into Th1 cells.

== Structure ==
The IFNG monomer consists of a core of six α-helices and an extended unfolded sequence in the C-terminal region. This is shown in the structural models below. The α-helices in the core of the structure are numbered 1 to 6.

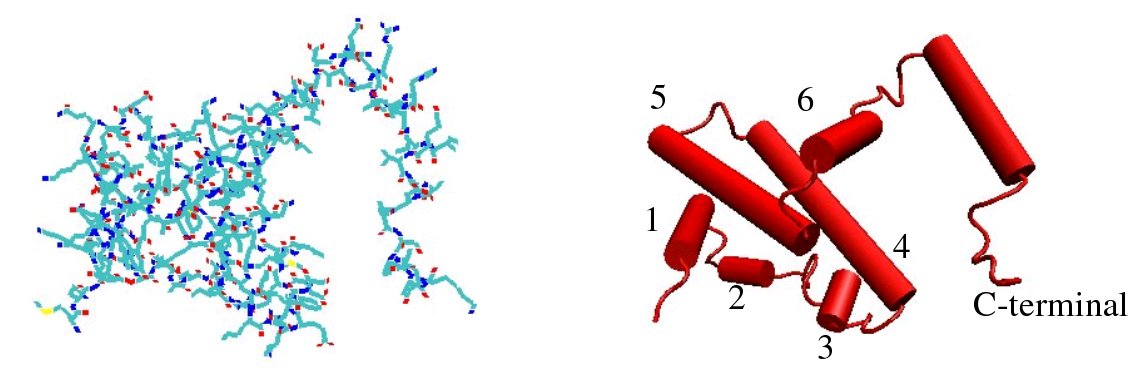
Figure 1. Line and cartoon representation of an IFN-γ monomer.

The biologically active dimer is formed by anti-parallel inter-locking of the two monomers as shown below. In the cartoon model, one monomer is shown in red, the other in blue.

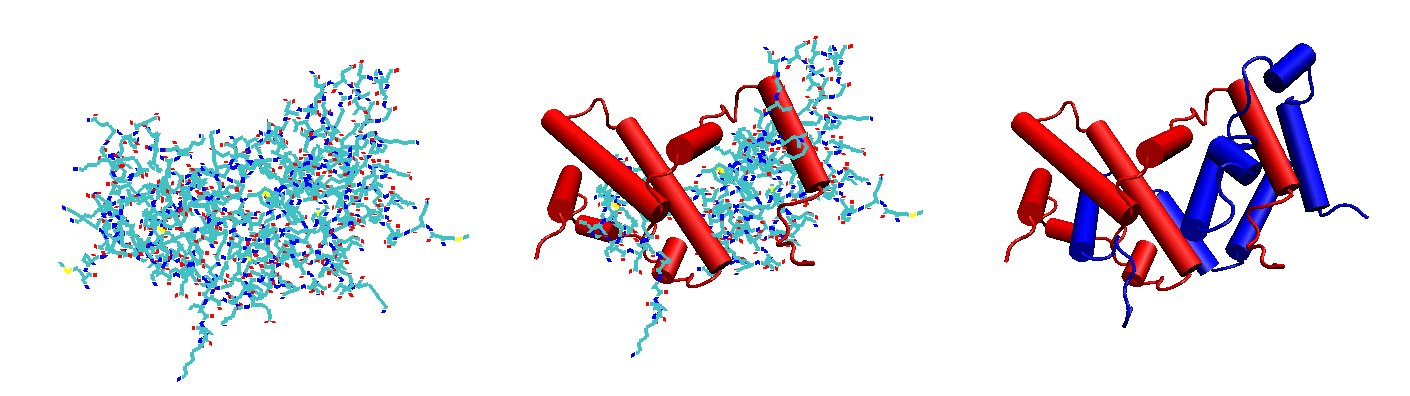
Figure 2. Line and cartoon representation of an IFN-γ dimer.

== Receptor binding ==
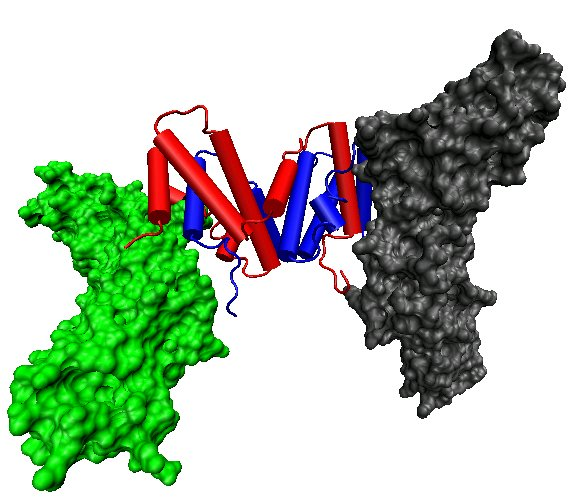
Figure 3. IFN dimer interacting with two IFNGR1 receptor molecules.

Cellular responses to IFNG are activated through its interaction with a heterodimeric receptor consisting of Interferon gamma receptor 1 (IFNGR1) and Interferon gamma receptor 2 (IFNGR2). IFN-γ binding to the receptor activates the JAK-STAT pathway. Activation of the JAK-STAT pathway induces upregulation of interferon-stimulated genes (ISGs), including MHC II. IFNG also binds to the glycosaminoglycan heparan sulfate (HS) at the cell surface. However, in contrast to many other heparan sulfate binding proteins, where binding promotes biological activity, the binding of IFNG to HS inhibits its biological activity.

The structural models shown in figures 1-3 for IFNG are all shortened at their C-termini by 17 amino acids. Full length IFNG is 143 amino acids long, the models are 126 amino acids long. Affinity for heparan sulfate resides solely within the deleted sequence of 17 amino acids. Within this sequence of 17 amino acids lie two clusters of basic amino acids termed D1 and D2, respectively. Heparan sulfate interacts with both of these clusters. In the absence of heparan sulfate the presence of the D1 sequence increases the rate at which IFNG-receptor complexes form. Interactions between the D1 cluster of amino acids and the receptor may be the first step in complex formation. By binding to D1 HS may compete with the receptor and prevent active receptor complexes from forming.

The biological significance of heparan sulfates interaction with IFNG is unclear; however, binding of the D1 cluster to HS may protect it from proteolytic cleavage.

== Signaling ==
IFNG binds to the type II cell-surface receptor, also known as the IFN gamma receptor (IFNGR) which is part of the class II cytokine receptor family. The IFNGR is composed of two subunits: the IFNGR1 and IFNGR2. IFNGR1 is associated with JAK1 and IFNGR2 is associated with JAK2. Upon IFNG binding the receptor, IFNGR1 and IFNGR2 undergo conformational changes that result in the autophosphorylation and activation of JAK1 and JAK2. This leads to a signaling cascade and eventual transcription of target genes. The expression of 236 different genes has been linked to type II IFN-mediated signaling. The proteins expressed by type II IFN-mediated signaling are primarily involved in promoting inflammatory immune responses and regulating other cell-mediated immune responses, such as apoptosis, intracellular IgG trafficking, cytokine signaling and production, hematopoiesis, and cell proliferation and differentiation.

=== JAK-STAT pathway ===
One key pathway triggered by IFNG binding IFNGRs is the Janus Kinase and Signal Transducer and Activator of Transcription pathway, more commonly referred to as the JAK-STAT pathway. In the JAK-STAT pathway, activated JAK1 and JAK2 proteins regulate the phosphorylation of tyrosine in STAT1 transcription factors. The tyrosines are phosphorylated at a very specific location, allowing activated STAT1 proteins to interact with each other come together to form STAT1-STAT1 homodimers. The STAT1-STAT1 homodimers can then enter the cell nucleus. They then initiate transcription by binding to gamma interferon activation site (GAS) elements, which are located in the promoter region of Interferon-stimulated genes (ISGs) that express for antiviral effector proteins, as well as positive and negative regulators of type II IFN signaling pathways.

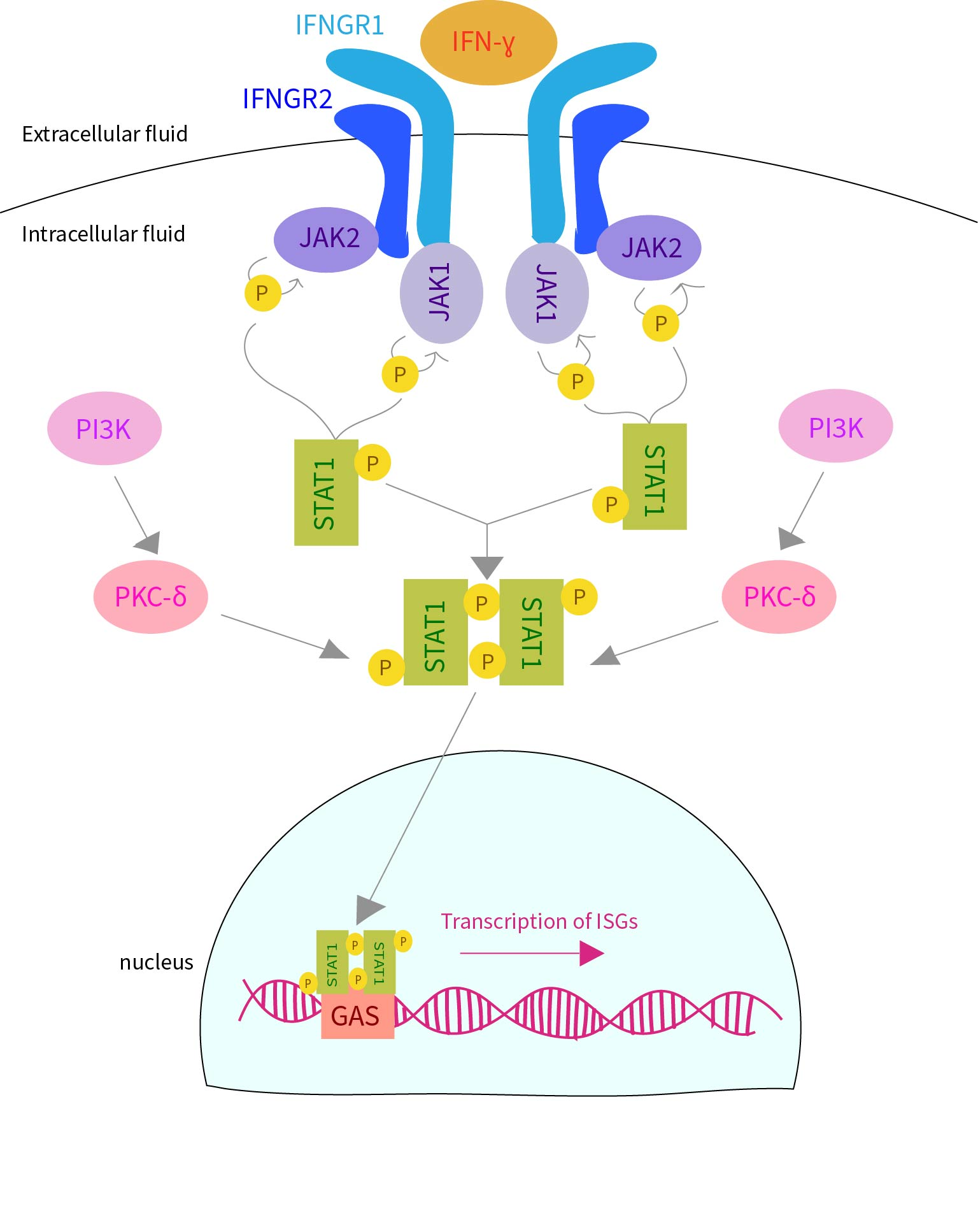
JAK-STAT signaling pathway activated by type II IFN.

The JAK proteins also lead to the activation of phosphatidylinositol 3-kinase (PI3K). PI3K leads to the activation of protein kinase C delta type (PKC-δ) which phosphorylates the amino acid serine in STAT1 transcription factors. The phosphorylation of the serine in STAT1-STAT1 homodimers are essential for the full transcription process to occur.

=== Other signaling pathways ===
Other signaling pathways that are triggered by IFNG are the mTOR signaling pathway, the MAPK signaling pathway, and the PI3K/AKT signaling pathway.

== Biological activity ==
IFNG is secreted by T helper cells (specifically, T_{h}1 cells), cytotoxic T cells (T_{C} cells), macrophages, mucosal epithelial cells and NK cells. IFNG is both an important autocrine signal for professional APCs in early innate immune response, and an important paracrine signal in adaptive immune response. The expression of IFNG is induced by the cytokines IL-12, IL-15, IL-18, and type I IFN. IFNG is the only Type II interferon and it is serologically distinct from Type I interferons; it is acid-labile, while the type I variants are acid-stable.

IFNG has antiviral, immunoregulatory, and anti-tumor properties. It alters transcription in up to 30 genes producing a variety of physiological and cellular responses. Among the effects are:

- Promotes NK cell activity
- Increases antigen presentation and lysosome activity of macrophages.
- Activates inducible nitric oxide synthase (iNOS)
- Induces the production of IgG2a and IgG3 from activated plasma B cells
- Causes normal cells to increase expression of class I MHC molecules as well as class II MHC on antigen-presenting cells—to be specific, through induction of antigen processing genes, including subunits of the immunoproteasome (MECL1, LMP2, LMP7), as well as TAP and ERAAP in addition possibly to the direct upregulation of MHC heavy chains and B2-microglobulin itself
- Promotes adhesion and binding required for leukocyte migration
- Induces the expression of intrinsic defense factors—for example, with respect to retroviruses, relevant genes include TRIM5alpha, APOBEC, and Tetherin, representing directly antiviral effects
- Primes alveolar macrophages against secondary bacterial infections.

IFNG is the primary cytokine that defines T_{h}1 cells: T_{h}1 cells secrete IFNG, which in turn causes more undifferentiated CD4^{+} cells (Th0 cells) to differentiate into T_{h}1 cells, representing a positive feedback loop—while suppressing T_{h}2 cell differentiation. (Equivalent defining cytokines for other cells include IL-4 for T_{h}2 cells and IL-17 for Th17 cells.)

NK cells and CD8+ cytotoxic T cells also produce IFNG. IFNG suppresses osteoclast formation by rapidly degrading the RANK adaptor protein TRAF6 in the RANK-RANKL signaling pathway, which otherwise stimulates the production of NF-κB.

=== Activity in granuloma formation ===
A granuloma is the body's way of dealing with a substance it cannot remove or sterilize. Infectious causes of granulomas (infections are typically the most common cause of granulomas) include tuberculosis, leprosy, histoplasmosis, cryptococcosis, coccidioidomycosis, blastomycosis, and toxoplasmosis. Examples of non-infectious granulomatous diseases are sarcoidosis, Crohn's disease, berylliosis, giant-cell arteritis, granulomatosis with polyangiitis, eosinophilic granulomatosis with polyangiitis, pulmonary rheumatoid nodules, and aspiration of food and other particulate material into the lung. The infectious pathophysiology of granulomas is discussed primarily here.

The key association between IFNG and granulomas is that IFNG activates macrophages so that they become more powerful in killing intracellular organisms. Activation of macrophages by IFNG from T_{h}1 helper cells in mycobacterial infections allows the macrophages to overcome the inhibition of phagolysosome maturation caused by mycobacteria (to stay alive inside macrophages). The first steps in IFNG-induced granuloma formation are activation of T_{h}1 helper cells by macrophages releasing IL-1 and IL-12 in the presence of intracellular pathogens, and presentation of antigens from those pathogens. Next the T_{h}1 helper cells aggregate around the macrophages and release IFNG, which activates the macrophages. Further activation of macrophages causes a cycle of further killing of intracellular bacteria, and further presentation of antigens to T_{h}1 helper cells with further release of IFNG. Finally, macrophages surround the T_{h}1 helper cells and become fibroblast-like cells walling off the infection.

=== Activity during pregnancy ===
Uterine natural killer cells (NKs) secrete high levels of chemoattractants, such as IFNG in mice. IFNG dilates and thins the walls of maternal spiral arteries to enhance blood flow to the implantation site. This remodeling aids in the development of the placenta as it invades the uterus in its quest for nutrients. IFNG knockout mice fail to initiate normal pregnancy-induced modification of decidual arteries. These models display abnormally low amounts of cells or necrosis of decidua.

In humans, elevated levels of IFN gamma have been associated with increased risk of miscarriage. Correlation studies have observed high IFNG levels in women with a history of spontaneous miscarriage, when compared to women with no history of spontaneous miscarriage. Additionally, low-IFNG levels are associated with women who successfully carry to term. It is possible that IFNG is cytotoxic to trophoblasts, which leads to miscarriage. However, causal research on the relationship between IFNG and miscarriage has not been performed due to ethical constraints.

== Interactions ==
Interferon gamma has been shown to interact with Interferon gamma receptor 1 and Interferon gamma receptor 2.

== Clinical relevance ==
=== Diseases ===
Interferon gamma has been shown to be a crucial player in the immune response against some intracellular pathogens, including that of Chagas disease. It has also been identified as having a role in seborrheic dermatitis.

IFNG has a significant anti-viral effect in herpes simplex virus I (HSV) infection. IFNG compromises the microtubules that HSV relies upon for transport into an infected cell's nucleus, inhibiting the ability of HSV to replicate. Studies in mice on acyclovir resistant herpes have shown that IFNG treatment can significantly reduce herpes viral load. The mechanism by which IFNG inhibits herpes reproduction is independent of T-cells, which means that IFNG may be an effective treatment in individuals with low T-cells.

Chlamydia infection is impacted by IFNG in host cells. In human epithelial cells, IFNG upregulates expression of indoleamine 2,3-dioxygenase, which in turn depletes tryptophan in hosts and impedes chlamydia's reproduction. Additionally, in rodent epithelial cells, IFNG upregulates a GTPase that inhibits chlamydial proliferation. In both the human and rodent systems, chlamydia has evolved mechanisms to circumvent the negative effects of host cell behavior.

=== IFNG autoantibodies ===
Neutralizing anti-interferon-γ autoantibodies (nAIGAs) are autoantibodies that bind to and inhibit IFNG, impairing its immunoregulatory function. These autoantibodies occur predominantly among individuals of South Asian ancestry. Notably, approximately 83% of individuals positive for nAIGAs carry specific HLA haplotypes, HLA-DRB115:01, HLA-DRB115:02, or HLA-DRB1*16:02. More than 85% of affected individuals develop recurrent infections with intramacrophagic pathogens, most commonly environmental non-tuberculous mycobacteria, Mycobacterium tuberculosis, Cryptococcus, Talaromyces marneffei, Coccidioides, Histoplasma, Burkholderia, and Salmonella species.

== Regulation ==
There is evidence that interferon-gamma expression is regulated by a pseudoknotted element in its 5' UTR. There is also evidence that interferon-gamma is regulated either directly or indirectly by the microRNAs: miR-29. Furthermore, there is evidence that interferon-gamma expression is regulated via GAPDH in T-cells. This interaction takes place in the 3'UTR, where binding of GAPDH prevents the translation of the mRNA sequence.

== Therapeutic use ==
Interferon gamma
Clinical data
- Trade names: Actimmune
- AHFS/Drugs.com: Monograph
- MedlinePlus: a601152
- ATC code: L03AB03 (WHO)

Identifiers
- IUPAC name: Human interferon gamma-1b
- CAS Number: 98059-61-1
- DrugBank: DB00033
- ChemSpider: none
- UNII: 21K6M2I7AG
- KEGG: D00747
- ChEMBL: ChEMBL1201564

Chemical and physical data
- Formula: C_{761}H_{1206}N_{214}O_{225}S_{6}
- Molar mass: 17145.65 g·mol^{−1}

Interferon gamma 1b is approved by the U.S. Food and Drug Administration to treat chronic granulomatous disease (CGD) and osteopetrosis. The mechanism by which IFNG benefits CGD is via enhancing the efficacy of neutrophils against catalase-positive bacteria by correcting patients' oxidative metabolism.

It was not approved to treat idiopathic pulmonary fibrosis (IPF). In 2002, the manufacturer InterMune issued a press release saying that phase III data demonstrated survival benefit in IPF and reduced mortality by 70% in patients with mild to moderate disease. The U.S. Department of Justice charged that the release contained false and misleading statements. InterMune's chief executive, Scott Harkonen, was accused of manipulating the trial data, was convicted in 2009 of wire fraud, and was sentenced to fines and community service. Harkonen appealed his conviction to the U.S. Court of Appeals for the Ninth Circuit, and lost. Harkonen was granted a full pardon on January 20, 2021.

Preliminary research on the role of IFNG in treating Friedreich's ataxia (FA) conducted by Children's Hospital of Philadelphia has found no beneficial effects in short-term (< 6-months) treatment. However, researchers in Turkey have discovered significant improvements in patients' gait and stance after 6 months of treatment.

Although not officially approved, Interferon gamma has also been shown to be effective in treating patients with moderate to severe atopic dermatitis. Specifically, recombinant IFNG therapy has shown promise in patients with lowered IFNG expression, such as those with predisposition to herpes simplex virus, and pediatric patients.

=== Production ===
Recombinant human IFNG, as an expensive biopharmaceutical, has been expressed in different expression systems including prokaryotic, protozoan, fungal (yeasts), plant, insect and mammalian cells. Human IFNG is commonly expressed in Escherichia coli, marketed as ACTIMMUNE®, however, the resulting product of the prokaryotic expression system is not glycosylated with a short half-life in the bloodstream after injection; the purification process from bacterial expression system is also very costly. Other expression systems like Pichia pastoris did not show satisfactory results in terms of yields.

=== Potential use in immunotherapy ===
IFNG increases an anti-proliferative state in cancer cells, while upregulating MHC I and MHC II expression, which increases immunorecognition and removal of pathogenic cells. IFNG also reduces metastasis in tumors by upregulating fibronectin, which negatively impacts tumor architecture. Increased IFNG mRNA levels in tumors at diagnosis has been associated to better responses to immunotherapy.

==== Cancer immunotherapy ====
The goal of cancer immunotherapy is to trigger an immune response by the patient's immune cells to attack and kill malignant (cancer-causing) tumor cells. Type II IFN deficiency has been linked to several types of cancer, including B-cell lymphoma and lung cancer. Furthermore, it has been found that in patients receiving the drug durvalumab to treat non-small cell lung carcinoma and transitional cell carcinoma had higher response rates to the drug, and the drug stunted the progression of both types of cancer for a longer duration of time. Thus, promoting the upregulation of type II IFN has been proven to be a crucial part in creating effective cancer immunotherapy treatments.

IFNG is not approved yet for the treatment in any cancer immunotherapy. However, improved survival was observed when IFNG was administered to patients with bladder carcinoma and melanoma cancers. The most promising result was achieved in patients with stage 2 and 3 of ovarian carcinoma. On the contrary, it was stressed: "Interferon-γ secreted by CD8-positive lymphocytes upregulates PD-L1 on ovarian cancer cells and promotes tumour growth." The in vitro study of IFNG in cancer cells is more extensive and results indicate anti-proliferative activity of IFNG leading to the growth inhibition or cell death, generally induced by apoptosis but sometimes by autophagy. In addition, it has been reported that mammalian glycosylation of recombinant human IFNG, expressed in HEK293, improves its therapeutic efficacy compared to the unglycosylated form that is expressed in E. coli.

==== Involvement in antitumor immunity ====
Type II IFN enhances Th1 cell, cytotoxic T cell, and APC activities, which results in an enhanced immune response against the malignant tumor cells, leading to tumor cell apoptosis and necroptosis (cell death). Furthermore, Type II IFN suppresses the activity of regulatory T cells, which are responsible for silencing immune responses against pathogens, preventing the deactivation of the immune cells involved in the killing of the tumor cells. Type II IFN prevents tumor cell division by directly acting on the tumor cells, which results in increased expression of proteins that inhibit the tumor cells from continuing through the cell cycle (i.e., cell cycle arrest). Type II IFN can also prevent tumor growth by indirectly acting on endothelial cells lining the blood vessels close to the site of the tumor, cutting off blood flow to the tumor cells and thus the supply of necessary resources for tumor cell survival and proliferation.

==== Barriers ====
The importance of type II IFN in cancer immunotherapy has been acknowledged; current research is studying the effects of type II IFN on cancer, both as a solo form of treatment and as a form of treatment to be administered alongside other anticancer drugs. But type II IFN has not been approved by the Food and Drug Administration (FDA) to treat cancer, except for malignant osteoporosis. This is most likely due to the fact that while type II IFN is involved in antitumor immunity, some of its functions may enhance the progression of a cancer. When type II IFN acts on tumor cells, it may induce the expression of a transmembrane protein known as programmed death-ligand 1 (PDL1), which allows the tumor cells to evade an attack from immune cells. Type II IFN-mediated signaling may also promote angiogenesis (formation of new blood vessels to the tumor site) and tumor cell proliferation.
