= Catch bond =

Type of chemical bond

A catch bond is a type of noncovalent bond whose dissociation lifetime increases with tensile force applied to the bond. Normally, bond lifetimes are expected to diminish with force. In the case of catch bonds, the lifetime of the bond actually increases up to a maximum before it decreases like in a normal bond. Catch bonds work in a way that is conceptually similar to that of a Chinese finger trap. While catch bonds are strengthened by an increase in force, the force increase is not necessary for the bond to work. Catch bonds were suspected for many years to play a role in the rolling of leukocytes, being strong enough to roll in presence of high forces caused by high shear stresses, while avoiding getting stuck in capillaries where the fluid flow, and therefore shear stress, is low. The existence of catch bonds was debated for many years until strong evidence of their existence was found in bacteria. Definite proof of their existence came shortly thereafter in leukocytes.

== Discovery ==
Catch bonds were first proposed in 1988 in the Proceedings of the Royal Society by M. Dembo et al. while at Los Alamos National Laboratory. While developing molecular model to study the critical tension required to detach a membrane bound to a surface through adhesion molecules, it was found that it is theoretically possible for bond dissociation to be increased by force, decreased by force, and independent of force. The terms "slip bond", "catch bond", and "ideal bond" were coined by Dembo to describe these three types of bond behaviors.

Slip bonds represent the ordinary behavior originally modeled by G. Bell, Dembo's former postdoctoral mentor at Los Alamos National Laboratory in 1978. Slip bonds were supported by flow chamber experiments where forces are applied on molecular bonds linking cells to chamber floor under shear flow. By comparison, no decisive evidence of catch bonds was found until 2003. This is due to experimental conditions that were unfavorable for detecting catch bonds, as well as the counterintuitive nature of the bonds themselves. For example, most early experiments were conducted in 96 well plates, an environment that does not provide any flow. Some experiments failed to produce shear stress that is now known to be critical to lengthen the lifetimes of catch bonds, while other experiments conducted under flow conditions too weak or too strong for optimal shear-induced strengthening of these bonds. Finally, Marshall and coworkers found that P-selectin:PSGL-1 bonds exhibited increasing bond lifetime as step loads were applied between 0 and ~10 pN for monomeric interaction but 1 and ~20 pN for dimeric interaction, exhibiting catch bond behavior; after reaching maximum values, which were ~0.6 and 1.2 seconds for monomeric and dimeric interaction, respectively, the bond lifetime fell rapidly at higher loads, displaying slip bond behavior ("catch-slip" bonds). These data were collected using an atomic force microscope and a flow chamber, and have subsequently been duplicated using a biomembrane force probe.

These finding prompted the discoveries of other important catch bonds in the 2000s, including those between L-selectin and PSGL-1 or endoglycan, FimH and mannose, myosin and actin, platelet glycoprotein Ib and von Willebrand factor, and integrin alpha 5 beta 1 and fibronectin. Emphasizing their importance and general acceptance, in the three years following their discovery there were at least 24 articles published on catch bonds.

More catch bonds were discovered in the 2010s, including E-selectin with carbohydrate ligands, G-actin with G-actin or F-actin, cadherin-catenin complex with actin, vinculin with F-actin, microtubule with kinetochore particle, integrin alpha L beta 2 and intercellular adhesion molecule 1 (ICAM-1), integrin alpha 4 beta 1 with vascular adhesion molecule 1, integrin alpha M beta 2 with ICAM-1, integrin alpha V beta 3 with fibronectin, and integrin alpha IIb beta 3 with fibronectin or fibrinogen.

Sivasankar and his research team have found that the mechanism behind the puzzling phenomenon is due to long-lived, force-induced hydrogen bonds. Using data from previous experiments, the team used molecular dynamics to discover that two rod-shaped cadherins in an X-dimer formed catch bonds when pulled and in the presence of calcium ions. The calcium ions keep the cadherins rigid, while pulling brings the proteins closer together, allowing for hydrogen bonds to form. The mechanism behind catch bonds helps to explain the biophysics behind cell-cell adhesion. According to the researchers, "Robust cadherin adhesion is essential for maintaining the integrity of tissue such as the skin, blood vessels, cartilage and muscle that are exposed to continuous mechanical assault."

The above catch bonds are formed between adhesion receptors and ligands, and among structural molecules and motor proteins, which bear force or generate force in their physiological function. An interesting recent development is the discoveries of catch bonds formed between signaling receptors and their ligands. These include bonds between T cell antigen receptors (TCR) or pre-TCR and peptide presented by major histocompatibility complex (pMHC) molecules, Fc gamma receptor and IgG Fc, and notch receptor and ligands. The presence of catch bonds in the interactions of these signaling (rather than adhesion) receptors have been suggested to be indicative of a possible role of these receptors as mechanoreceptors.

== Variations and related dynamic bonds ==
=== Triphasic bonds ===
Other type of "dynamic bonds" have been defined in addition to the original types of catch bonds, slip bonds and ideal bonds classified by Dembo. Unlike slip bonds, which have been observed in the entire force range tested, catch bonds only exist within certain force range as any molecular bond would eventually be overpowered by high enough force. Therefore, catch bonds are always followed by slip bonds, hence termed "catch-slip bonds". More variations have also been observed, e.g., triphasic slip-catch-slip bonds.

=== Flex bonds ===
The transition between catch and slip bonds have been modeled as molecular dissociation from two bond states along two pathways. Dissociation along each pathway alone results in a slip bond but at different rates. At low forces, dissociation occurs predominately along the fast pathway. Increasing force tilts the multi-dimensional energy landscape to switch the dissociation from fast pathway to slow pathway, manifesting catch bond. As dissociation along the slow pathway dominates, further increase in force accelerates dissociation, manifesting slip bond. This switching behavior is also called flex bond.

=== Dynamic catch ===
The above bonds involve bimolecular interactions, which arguably represents the simplest types. A new type of catch bonds emerges when trimolecular interactions are involved. In such cases, one molecule can interact with the two counter-molecules using two binding sites, either separately, i.e. one at a time in the absence of the other to form bimolecular bonds, or concurrently to form a trimolecular bond when both counter-molecules are present. An interesting finding is that even when the two bimolecular interactions behave as slip bonds, the trimolecular interaction can behave as catch bond. This new type of catch bond, which requires concurrent and cooperative binding, is termed dynamic catch.

=== Cyclic mechanical reinforcement ===
Most catch bonds were demonstrated using force-clamp force spectroscopy where upon initial ramping, a constant force is loaded on the bond to observe how long the bond lasts, i.e., measuring the bond lifetime at a constant force. Catch bonds are revealed when the mean bond lifetime (reciprocally related to the rate of bond dissociation) increases with the clamped force. Zhu and colleagues demonstrated that bond lifetime measured at the force-clamp phase could be substantially prolonged if the initial ramping included two forms of pre-conditioning: 1) loading the bond by ramping the force to a high level (peak force) before clamping the force at a low level for lifetime measurement, and 2) loading and unloading the bond repeatedly by multiple force cycles before clamping the force at a peak value for lifetime measurement. This new bond type, termed cyclic mechanical reinforcement (CMR), is distinct from catch bond, but it nevertheless resembles catch bond in that the bond lifetime increases with the peak force and with the number of cycles used to pre-condition the bond. CMR has been observed for interactions between integrin alpha 5 beta 1 and fibronectin and between G-actin and G-actin or F-actin.

=== Force history dependence ===
The CMR phenomenon indicates that how long a bond can sustain force at a given level can depend on the history of force application prior to arriving at that force level. In other words, the "rate constant" of molecular dissociation at a constant force depends not only on the value of force at the current time but also on the prior force history the bond has experienced in the past. This has indeed been observed for interactions of P-selectin with PSGL-1 or anti-P-selectin antibody, L-selectin with PSGL-1, myosin with actin, integrin alpha V beta 3 with fibrinogen, and TCR with pMHC.

== Various catch bonds of specific molecular interactions ==
=== Selectin bond ===
==== Background ====
Leukocytes, as well as other types of white blood cells, normally form weak and short-lived bonds with other cells via selectin. Coated outside the membrane of leukocytes are microvilli, which have various types of adhesive molecules, including P-selectin glycoprotein ligand-1 (PSGL-1), a glycoprotein that is normally decorated with sulfated sialyl-Lewis x. the sulfated-sialyl-Lewis-x-contained PSGL-1 molecule has the ability to bind to any type of selectin. Leukocytes also exhibit L-selectin that binds to other cells or other leukocytes that contain PSGL-1 molecules.

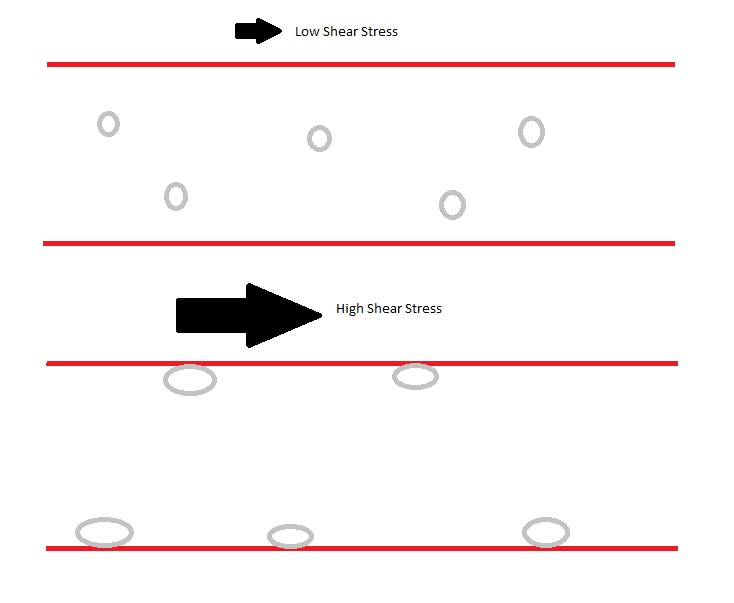
Top: Under normal blood flow conditions, leukocytes (gray circles) float freely in the bloodstream. Bottom: Under conditions of infection and inflammation, high shear stress causes leukocytes to bind and roll along blood vessel walls (red lines). This is known as the shear-threshold phenomenon.

An important example of catch bonds is their role in leukocyte extravasation. During this process, leukocytes move through the circulatory system to sites of infection, and in doing so they 'roll' and bind to selectin molecules on the vessel wall. While able to float freely in the blood under normal circumstances, shear stress induced by inflammation causes leukocytes to attach to the endothelial vessel wall and begin rolling rather than floating downstream. This "shear-threshold phenomenon" was initially characterized in 1996 by Finger et al. who showed that leukocyte binding and rolling through L-selectin is only maintained when a critical shear-threshold is applied to the system. Multiple sources of evidence have shown that catch bonds are responsible for the tether and roll mechanism that allows this critical process to occur. Catch bonds allow increasing force to convert short-lived tethers into stronger, longer-lived binding interactions, thus decreasing the rolling velocity and increasing the regularity of rolling steps. However, this mechanism only works at an optimal force. As shear force increases past this force, bonds revert to slip bonds, creating an increase in velocity and irregularity of rolling.

==== Leukocytes adhesion mediated by shear stress ====
In blood vessel, at very low shear stress of ~.3 dynes per squared centimeter, leukocytes do not adhere to the blood vessel endothelial cells. Cells move along the blood vessel at a rate proportional to the blood flow rate. Once the shear stress pass that shear threshold value, leukocytes start to accumulate via selectin binding. At low shear stress above the threshold of about .3 to 5 dynes per squared centimeter, leukocytes alternate between binding and non-binding. Because one leukocyte has many selectins around the surface, these selectin binding/ unbinding cause a rolling motion on the blood vessel. As the shear stress continue to increase, the selectin bonds becomes stronger, causing the rolling velocity to be slower. This reduction in leukocytes rolling velocity allow cells to stop and perform firm binding via integrin binding. Selectin binding do not exhibit "true" catch bond property. Experiments show that at very high shear stress (passing a second threshold), the selectin binding transit between a catch bond to a slip bond binding, in which the rolling velocity increases as the shear force increases.

==== Leukocyte rolling mediated by catch-slip transition ====
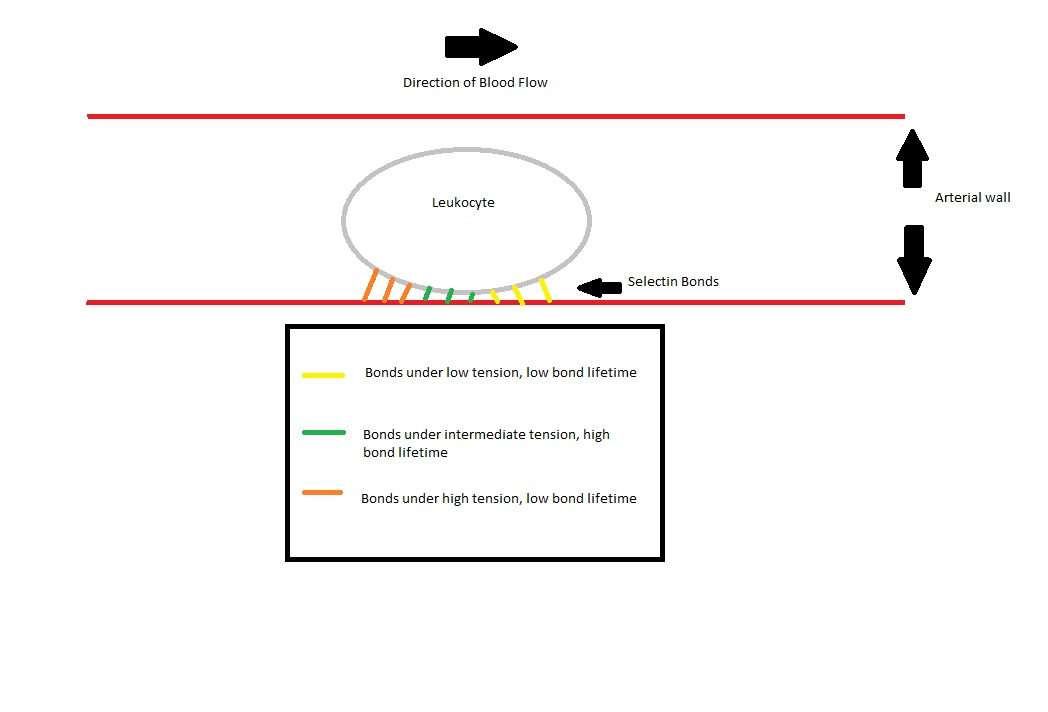
Catch-slip transition allows leukocytes to roll along blood vessel walls.

Researchers have hypothesized that the ability of leukocytes to maintain attachment and rolling on the blood vessel wall can be explained by a combination of many factors, including cell flattening to maintain a larger binding surface-area and reduce hydrodynamic drag, as well as tethers holding the rear of the rolling cell to the endothelium breaking and slinging to the front of the rolling cell to reattach to the endothelial wall. These hypotheses work well with Marshall's 2003 findings that selectin bonds go through a catch-slip transition in which initial increases in shear force strengthen the bond, but with enough applied force bond lifetimes begin to decay exponentially. Therefore, the weak binding of a sling at the leading edge of a rolling leukocyte would initially be strengthened as the cell rolls farther and the tension on the bond increases, preventing the cell from dissociating from the endothelial wall and floating freely in the bloodstream despite high shear forces. However, at the trailing edge of the cell, tension becomes high enough to transition the bond from catch to slip, and the bonds tethering the trailing edge eventually break, allowing the cell to roll further instead of remaining stationary.

==== Proposed mechanisms of action ====
===== Allosteric model =====
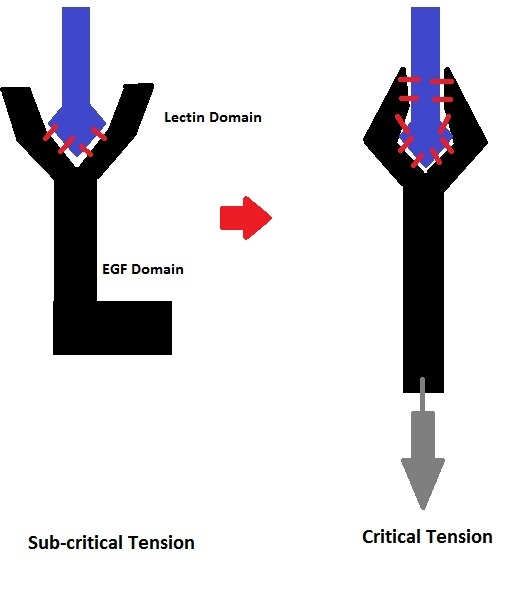
Allosteric model states that applied tension results in an extended conformation of the EGF domain, causing a conformational change to the lectin domain, resulting in increased binding affinity.

Though catch bonds are now widely recognized, their mechanism of action is still under dispute. Two leading hypotheses dominate the discussion. The first hypothesis, the allosteric model, stems from evidence that x-ray crystallography of selectin proteins shows two conformational states: a bent conformation in the absence of ligand, and an extended conformation in the presence of the ligand. The main domains involved in these states are a lectin domain which contains the ligand binding site and an EGF domain which can shift between bent and extended conformations. The allosteric model claims that tension on the EGF domain favors the extended conformation, and extension of this domain causes a conformational shift in the lectin domain, resulting in greater binding affinity for the ligand. As a result of this conformational change, the ligand is effectively locked in place despite tension exerted on the bond.

===== Sliding-rebinding model =====
The sliding-rebinding model differs from the allosteric model in that the allosteric model posits that only one binding site exists and can be altered, but the sliding-rebinding model states that multiple binding sites exist and aren't changed by EGF extension. Rather, in the bent conformation which is favored at low applied forces, the applied force is perpendicular to the line of possible binding sites. Thus, when the association between ligand and lectin domain is interrupted, the bond quickly dissociates. At larger applied forces, however, the protein is extended and the line of possible binding sites is aligned with the applied force, allowing the ligand to quickly re-associate with a new binding site after the initial interaction is disrupted. With multiple binding sites, and even the ability to re-associate with the original binding site, the rate of ligand dissociation would be decreased as is typical of catch bonds.

===== Mechanism of a single selectin binding =====
A single PSGL-1 and selectin binding is similar to conventional protein binding when the force is kept constant, with a dissociation constant. As the force exerted starts to increase, the dissociation constant decreases, causing binding to become stronger. As the force reach a threshold level of 11 pN, the dissociation constant starts to increase again, weakening the bond, causing the bond to exhibit a slip bond property.

=== FimH bond ===
==== Background ====
Catch bonds also play a significant role in bacterial adhesion, most notably in Escherichia coli. E. coli and other bacteria residing in the intestine must be able to adhere to intestinal walls or risk being eliminated from the body through defecation. This is possible due to the bacterial protein FimH, which mediates high adhesion in response to high flow. The lectin domain is one that provides FimH binding the catch bond property when binding to mannose residues from other cells. Experiments have shown that when force is loaded rapidly, bonds were able to survive high forces, thus pointing to catch bond behavior. Catch bonds are responsible for the failure of E. coli in the urinary tract to be eliminated during urination, thus leading to a urinary tract infection. This knowledge is important not only in understanding bacteria, but also for learning how anti-adhesive technologies can be created.

==== Bacteria adhesion mediated by shear stress ====
Similar to selectin binding, FimH binding also have a threshold where it only starts binding to the host cells above this threshold. This shear stress threshold is about 1 dynes per squared centimeter, slightly larger than that of selectin binding. Above this threshold, FimH also alternate between binding, pause and unbinding with the mannose residues. However, different from selectin binding, FimH binding to mannose-BSA can either have a very long or very short pauses. This cause FimH binding to exhibit a "stick-and-roll" adhesion, not rolling adhesion in the case of selectin binding. And unlike selectin binding which requires integrin to help with firm adhesion, FimH binding can become stationary, and this process is reversible. All of this is mediated by shear stress level: at shear stress higher than 20 dynes per squared centimeter, FimH binding is stationary. At shear stress higher than 100 dynes per squared centimeter, slow rolling is observed.

== See also ==
- Noncovalent bonding
- Ionic bond
- Hydrogen bond
- Van der Waals force
- Intermolecular force
- Slip bond
