= Weibel =

Weibel may refer to the office of "usher" in Switzerland, see Huissier; it is also a personal name.

== Surname ==
- Adèle Coulin Weibel (1880-1963), Swiss-American art historian, curator
- Charles Weibel (born 1950) - American mathematician
- Weibel (sport shooter) - Swiss Olympic sports shooter
- Peter Weibel (1944–2023) - Austrian artist
- Ewald Weibel - Swiss biologist
- Deana L. Weibel – American cultural anthropologist
- Renée Weibel (born 1986), Swiss actor

== Other uses ==
- Weibel Scientific - a Danish designer and manufacturer of doppler radars
- Weibel–Palade body - storage granules of the endothelial cells, that form the inner lining of the blood vessels and heart
- Weibel Elementary School
- Weibel M/1932 - a light machine gun concept of Danish origin
- Weibel instability - a plasma instability present in homogeneous or nearly homogeneous electromagnetic plasma
