= Psel =

Psel or PSEL may refer to:

- Psel (river), a tributary of the Dnieper in Russia and Ukraine
- P-selectin
- Printed segmented electroluminescence
- Pseudaminic acid synthase, an enzyme
