= Andrew A. Biewener =

American biologist (born 1952)

- Born: 1952 (age 73–74)
- Education: Duke University, Harvard University
- Occupation: comparative biochemist
- Known for: Charles P. Lyman Professor of Biology, Department of Organismic and Evolutionary Biology, Harvard University
- Notable work: study of scaling of musculoskeletal design in mammals
- Awards: Fellow, American Association for the Advancement of Science

Andrew Biewener (born 1952) is the Charles P. Lyman Professor of Biology in the Department of Organismic and Evolutionary Biology at Harvard University and Faculty Director of the Concord Field Station. He is also a Fellow of the American Association for the Advancement of Science.

== Training and career ==
Born in 1952, Biewener began his zoological studies at Duke University in the early 1970s. He then pursued graduate studies in the field of comparative biomechanics, receiving a Master's (1981) and PhD (1982) from Harvard University, studying under the direction of C. Richard Taylor and Thomas A. McMahon. During his graduate studies, he had the opportunity to collaborate with R. McNeill Alexander from Leeds University and Lance E. Lanyon from the University of Bristol. In 1982, he joined the Department of Organismal Biology and Anatomy at The University of Chicago as a faculty member, serving as department chair from 1995 to 1998. In 1998, he returned to Harvard to become the director of the Concord Field Station and a professor of biology in the Department of Organismic and Evolutionary Biology (OEB); he served as OEB's department chair from 2001 to 2010. Biewener was president of the American Society of Biomechanics from 2001 to 2002.

== Research ==
As a comparative biomechanist, Biewener has studied the scaling of musculoskeletal design in mammals, adaptive bone remodeling, the in vivo contractile function of skeletal muscles during terrestrial locomotion in birds and mammals as well as during flight in birds, and the neuromechanical control of locomotor movement. The latter has involved collaborations with biorobotic engineers. His research has also involved experimental validation and development of Hill-type muscle models, commonly used in musculoskeletal modeling and simulations of movement to improve rehabilitation approaches for human subjects following physical injury or disease.
