= Charles Richard Taylor =

American biologist

- Taylor in Ascona, Switzerland, in 1995
- Born: Charles Richard Taylor; September 8, 1939; Tempe, Arizona, US
- Died: September 10, 1995 (aged 56)
- Education: Occidental College; Harvard University
- Scientific career
- Fields: Physiology, comparative physiology

Charles Richard Taylor (September 8, 1939 – September 10, 1995) was an American biologist whose career focused on animal physiology. After conducting work in east Africa, Taylor became the Charles P. Lyman professor of biology at Harvard University and was named first director the University's Concord Field Station. Taylor was elected to the American National Academy of Sciences in 1985.

== Early life ==
C. Richard (Dick) Taylor was born in Tempe, Arizona in 1939 to Rosalind and Norman Taylor, a Methodist minister. Richard was the third of four sons. In 1941 the family moved to Los Angeles, where Taylor attended public high schools and then admitted to Occidental College. Taylor completed his bachelor's degree in biology in 1960. Shortly thereafter he published his first paper in the journal Nature with biologist Jack W. Hudson, on blood uric acid buildup in flying birds.

Taylor began his graduate studies at Harvard University in 1960, obtaining his masters in 1962 and PhD in 1963. His PhD topic, "The thermoregulatory function of the horns of Bovidae," was inspired by the observation that goat horns become hot when the animal is excited. Taylor concluded that horns were especially valuable as mechanisms of thermoregulation in very hot or very cold environments.

== Research in east Africa ==
In 1964 Taylor was appointed a research fellow at the Harvard Museum of Comparative Zoology. With research funded by the National Science Foundation, he traveled to Kenya and began working at the Muguga Veterinary Faculty physiological laboratories of the University of Nairobi, investigating whether and how African antelopes might survive in desert regions without drinking water. Taylor made a number of important discoveries, including the fact that certain large bovids can remain active in very hot environments by increasing their body temperatures and radiative heat loss, while cooling their brains with novel blood circulation strategies.

Taylor returned to the United States in 1968 as a postdoctoral research fellow at Duke University. There, in collaboration with comparative physiologist Knut Schmidt-Nielsen, Taylor began investigating the energetics of animals running at different speeds using custom-built treadmills, with a special focus on the scaling of body size and metabolic rate.

Taylor also continued his work in Kenya by continuing his studies of the energetics of animal locomotion in relation gas exchange.

== Director of Harvard's Concord Field Station ==
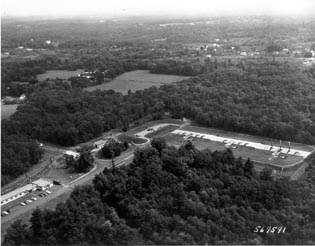
1959 Bedford Nike missile facility

In 1970, Taylor returned to Harvard as a faculty member in the Department of Biology and became the first faculty Director of the Harvard's new Concord Field Station (CFS) located in Bedford, Massachusetts established from an abandoned 1960s Nike missile facility. Taylor directed research at the CFS using both wild and domesticated animals for the next two-and-a-half decades. Research by Taylor and his colleagues revealed that kangaroos could increase their hopping speed with no increase in metabolic rate (in contrast to other terrestrial animals) by means of elastic energy savings in their tendons and that horses change their gait to minimize their energy cost of transport.

In collaboration with Giovanni Cavagna and Norman Heglund, Taylor showed that walking and running involve two different energy saving strategies: an inverted pendulum to exchange center of mass (CoM) potential and kinetic energy during walking and a mass-spring mechanism to store and recover elastic energy from the legs to the CoM during running. In a series of papers, they also showed that the mechanical work involved in moving an animal's limbs and its body CoM did not scale with body size as was observed for the metabolic cost of locomotion. Using the first force-platform treadmill, Taylor and his student Rodger Kram showed that the scaling of metabolic cost of terrestrial locomotion better correlated with the rate and magnitude of force exerted by an animal's limbs on the ground. Over a productive 10 year span (1979-1989), Taylor also collaborated with Swiss morphologist Ewald Weibel and his research group to explore structure-function scaling relationships between locomotion energetics and morphological design features underlying the transport of oxygen by the cardio-respiratory system to the muscles during exercise, which they termed symmorphosis.

Taylor died of a heart attack in 1995.

== See also ==
- Alfred W. Crompton

== Additional resources ==
- Bolis, L., K. Schmidt-Nielsen, and S. H. P. Maddrell (eds.). 1973. Comparative physiology. Amsterdam and London: North-Holland Publishing Company.
- Hoyt, D. F., and C. R. Taylor. 1981. Gait and the energetics of locomotion in horses. Nature 292:239–240.
- Sapoval, B., M. Filoche, and E. R. Weibel, 2002. Smaller is better—but not too small: A physical scale for the design of the mammalian pulmonary acinus. Proc. Natl. Acad. Sci. U.S.A. 99:10411–10416.
- Schmidt-Nielsen, K. 1964. Desert animals: Physiological problems of heat and water. Oxford, UK: Oxford University Press.
- Schmidt-Nielsen, K. 1998. The camel’s nose: Memoirs of a curious scientist. Washington, DC: Island Press.
- Weibel E. R., 1973. Morphological basis of alveolar-capillary gas exchange. Physiol. Rev. 53:419–495.
- Weibel E. R., C. R. Taylor, and L. Bolis. 1998. Principles of animal design: The optimization and symmorphosis debate. New York: Cambridge University Press.
- Weibel E. R., 2000. Symmorphosis: On form and function in shaping life. Cambridge, MA: Harvard University Press.
