= PSEI =

PSEI may refer to:

- Pseudaminic acid synthase, an enzyme
- PSE Composite Index, a Filipino stock market index
