= Selectin =

Family of cell adhesion molecules

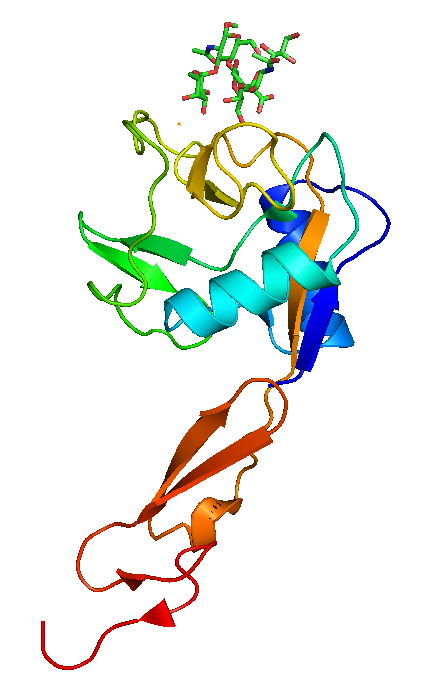
- Crystallographic structure of P-selectin lectin bound to sugar, shown in sticks.

Identifiers
- Symbol: Selectin
- InterPro: IPR002396
- Membranome: 12
Available protein structures:
- PDB: IPR002396
- AlphaFold: IPR002396

The selectins (cluster of differentiation 62 or CD62) are a family of cell adhesion molecules (or CAMs). All selectins are single-chain transmembrane glycoproteins that share similar properties to C-type lectins due to a related amino terminus and calcium-dependent binding. Selectins bind to sugar moieties and so are considered to be a type of lectin, cell adhesion proteins that bind sugar polymers.

== Structure ==
All three known members of the selectin family (L-, E-, and P-selectin) share a similar cassette structure: an N-terminal, calcium-dependent lectin domain, an epidermal growth factor (EGF)-like domain, a variable number of consensus repeat units (2, 6, and 9 for L-, E-, and P-selectin, respectively), a transmembrane domain (TM) and an intracellular cytoplasmic tail (cyto). The transmembrane and cytoplasmic parts are not conserved across the selectins being responsible for their targeting to different compartments. Though they share common elements, their tissue distribution and binding kinetics are quite different, reflecting their divergent roles in various pathophysiological processes.

== Types ==
There are three subsets of selectins:

- E-selectin (in endothelial cells)
- L-selectin (in leukocytes)
- P-selectin (in platelets and endothelial cells)

L-selectin is the smallest of the vascular selectins, expressed on all granulocytes and monocytes and on most lymphocytes, can be found in most leukocytes. P-selectin, the largest selectin, is stored in α-granules of platelets and in Weibel–Palade bodies of endothelial cells, and is translocated to the cell surface of activated endothelial cells and platelets. E-selectin is not expressed under baseline conditions, except in skin microvessels, but is rapidly induced by inflammatory cytokines.

These three types share a significant degree of sequence homology among themselves (except in the transmembrane and cytoplasmic domains) and between species. Analysis of this homology has revealed that the lectin domain, which binds sugars, is most conserved, suggesting that the three selectins bind similar sugar structures. The cytoplasmic and transmembrane domains are highly conserved between species, but not conserved across the selectins. These parts of the selectin molecules are responsible for their targeting to different compartments: P-selectin to secretory granules, E-selectin to the plasma membrane, and L-selectin to the tips of microfolds on leukocytes.

== Etymology ==
The name selectin comes from the words "selected" and "lectins," which are a type of carbohydrate-recognizing protein.

== Function ==
Selectins are involved in constitutive lymphocyte homing, and in chronic and acute inflammation processes, including post-ischemic inflammation in muscle, kidney and heart, skin inflammation, atherosclerosis, glomerulonephritis and lupus erythematosus and cancer metastasis.

During an inflammatory response, P-selectin is expressed on endothelial cells first, followed by E-selectin later. Stimuli such as histamine and thrombin cause endothelial cells to mobilize immediate release of preformed P-selectin from Weible-Palade bodies inside the cell. Cytokines such as TNF-alpha stimulate transcription and translation of E-selectin and additional P-selectin, which account for the delay of several hours.

As the leukocyte rolls along the blood vessel wall, the distal lectin-like domain of the selectin binds to certain carbohydrate groups presented on proteins (such as PSGL-1) on the leukocyte, which slows the cell and allows it to leave the blood vessel and enter the site of infection. The low-affinity nature of selectins is what allows the characteristic "rolling" action attributed to leukocytes during the leukocyte adhesion cascade.

Each selectin has a carbohydrate recognition domain that mediates binding to specific glycans on apposing cells. They have remarkably similar protein folds and carbohydrate binding residues, leading to overlap in the glycans to which they bind.

Selectins bind to the sialyl Lewis X (SLe^{x}) determinant "NeuAcα2-3Galβ1-4(Fucα1-3)GlcNAc." However, SLe^{x}, per se, does not constitute an effective selectin receptor. Instead, SLe^{x} and related sialylated, fucosylated glycans are components of more extensive binding determinants.

The best-characterized ligand for the three selectins is P-selectin glycoprotein ligand-1 (PSGL-1), which is a mucin-type glycoprotein expressed on all white blood cells.

Neutrophils and eosinophils bind to E-selectin. One of the reported ligands for E-selectin is the sialylated Lewis X antigen (SLe^{x}). Eosinophils, like neutrophils, use sialylated, protease-resistant structures to bind to E-selectin, although the eosinophil expresses much lower levels of these structures on its surface.

Ligands for P-selectin on eosinophils and neutrophils are similar sialylated, protease-sensitive, endo-beta-galactosidase-resistant structures, clearly different from those reported for E-selectin, and suggest disparate roles for P-selectin and E-selectin during recruitment during inflammatory responses.

== Bonding mechanisms ==
Selectins have hinge domains, allowing them to undergo rapid conformational changes in the nanosecond range between 'open' and 'closed' conformations. Shear stress on the selectin molecule causes it to favor the 'open' conformation.

In leukocyte rolling, the 'open' conformation of the selectin allows it to bind to inward sialyl Lewis molecules farther up along the PSGL-1 chain, increasing overall binding affinity—if the selectin-sialyl Lewis bond breaks, it can slide and form new bonds with the other sialyl Lewis molecules down the chain. In the 'closed' conformation, however, the selectin is only able to bind to one sialyl Lewis molecule, and thus has greatly reduced binding affinity.

The result of such is that selectins exhibit catch and slip bond behavior—under low shear stresses, their bonding affinities are actually increased by an increase in tensile force applied to the bond because of more selectins preferring the 'open' conformation. At high stresses, the binding affinities are still reduced because the selectin-ligand bond is still a normal slip bond. It is thought that this shear stress threshold helps select for the right diameter of blood vessels to initiate leukocyte extravasation, and may also help prevent inappropriate leukocyte aggregation during vascular stasis.

== Role in cancer ==
It is becoming evident that selectin may play a role in inflammation and progression of cancer. Tumor cells exploit the selectin-dependent mechanisms mediating cell tethering and rolling interactions through recognition of carbohydrate ligands on tumor cell to enhance distant organ metastasis, showing 'leukocyte mimicry'.

A number of studies have shown increased expression of carbohydrate ligands on metastatic tumor, enhanced E-selectin expression on the surface of endothelial vessels at the site at tumor metastasis, and the capacity of metastatic tumor cells to roll and adhere to endothelial cells, indicating the role of selectins in metastasis. In addition to E-selectin, the role of P-selectin (expressed on platelets) and L-selectin (on leukocytes) in cancer dissemination has been suggested in the way that they interact with circulating cancer cells at an early stage of metastasis.

=== Organ selectivity ===
The selectins and selectin ligands determine the organ selectivity of metastasis. Several factors may explain the seed and soil theory or homing of metastasis. In particular, genetic regulation and activation of specific chemokines, cytokines and proteases may direct metastasis to a preferred organ. In fact, the extravasation of circulating tumor cells in the host organ requires successive adhesive interactions between endothelial cells and their ligands or counter-receptors present on the cancer cells. Metastatic cells that show a high propensity to metastasize to certain organs adhere at higher rates to venular endothelial cells isolated from these target sites. Moreover, they invade the target tissue at higher rates and respond better to paracrine growth factors released from the target site.

Typically, the cancer cell/endothelial cell interactions imply first a selectin-mediated initial attachment and rolling of the circulating cancer cells on the endothelium. The rolling cancer cells then become activated by locally released chemokines present at the surface of endothelial cells. This triggers the activation of integrins from the cancer cells allowing their firmer adhesion to members of the Ig-CAM family such as ICAM, initiating the transendothelial migration and extravasation processes.[72]

The appropriate set of endothelial receptors is sometimes not expressed constitutively and the cancer cells have to trigger their expression. In this context, the culture supernatants of cancer cells can trigger the expression of E- selectin by endothelial cells suggesting that cancer cells may release by themselves cytokines such as TNF-α, IL-1β or INF-γ that will directly activate endothelial cells to express E-selectin, P-selectin, ICAM-2 or VCAM. On the other hand, several studies further show that cancer cells may initiate the expression of endothelial adhesion molecules in a more indirect ways.

Since the adhesion of several cancer cells to endothelium requires the presence of endothelial selectins as well as sialyl Lewis carbohydrates on cancer cells, the degree of expression of selectins on the vascular wall and the presence of the appropriate ligand on cancer cells are determinant for their adhesion and extravasation into a specific organ. The differential selectin expression profile on endothelium and the specific interactions of selectins expressed by endothelial cells of potential target organs and their ligands expressed on cancer cells are major determinants that underlie the organ-specific distribution of metastases.

== Research ==
Selectins are involved in projects to treat osteoporosis, a disease that occurs when bone-creating cells called osteoblasts become too scarce. Osteoblasts develop from stem cells, and scientists hope to eventually be able to treat osteoporosis by adding stem cells to a patient's bone marrow. Researchers have developed a way to use selectins to direct stem cells introduced into the vascular system to the bone marrow. E-selectins are constitutively expressed in the bone marrow, and researchers have shown that tagging stem cells with a certain glycoprotein causes these cells to migrate to the bone marrow. Thus, selectins may someday be essential to a regenerative therapy for osteoporosis.

== See also ==
- Sushi domain
