= Julie Baker =

American biologist

- Education: Hamline University; Columbia University
- Known for: Cell fate determination Placenta
- Scientific career
- Fields: Biology, Genetics, Genomics
- Website: https://baker-lab.stanford.edu/

Julie Baker is an American biologist who studies genetics and genomics, cell fate determination, and cellular communication. She is a professor of Genetics at the Stanford University School of Medicine and is a member of Stanford Bio-X and the Stanford Maternal & Child Health Research Institute (MCHRI).

== Education and teaching ==
Baker graduated Hamline University with a BA in Biology in 1989. She then earned her PhD in Molecular Genetics and Genetics and Developmental Biology from Columbia University in 1995. From 1995 to 1999 Baker studied Developmental Biology and Embryology at the University of California, Berkeley.

Baker is now a Professor of Genetics at Stanford University.

== Research ==
Baker has published work in several academic journals, including Genome Research, Developmental Biology, Placenta, Development, and Developmental Dynamics. Her research on the ancestral origin of the human placenta has been covered by The Wall Street Journal and The Scientist.

Baker's collaborators include Richard Harland and Anne Brunet.

Baker was one of the winners of the 2019 Discovery Innovation Awards.
