= Ami Bhatt =

American physician-scientist

Ami Bhatt is an American physician-scientist who studies the link between blood cancers and the human gut microbiome. She is a Professor of Genetics and Medicine (Hematology) at Stanford University. She is a member of Stanford Bio-X, the Stanford Cancer Institute, Stanford Maternal & Child Health Research Institute (MCHRI), and Stanford ChEM-H. In addition, Bhatt is the co-founder of Global Oncology Inc., a nonprofit focused on providing quality oncologic treatment in resource-constrained settings.

== Education ==
Bhatt completed her PhD in Biochemistry and Molecular Biology in 2005 and earned her MD degree in 2007, both from the University of California, San Francisco. She then underwent her residency and chief residency in Internal Medicine at Brigham and Women's Hospital, a teaching hospital of Harvard Medical School. Bhatt then pursued a Hematology and Oncology fellowship at the Dana-Farber Cancer Institute. After this she was a post-doc at the Broad Institute and MIT.

== Awards ==
Bhatt won the 2018 Chen Award of Excellence by the Human Genome Organisation.

The Chan Zuckerberg Initiative awarded a $525,000 research grant to Bhatt, along with colleagues Anne Brunet and K. Christopher Garcia, for their project "Analyzing how inflammation affects the aging brain."

Bhatt was named a 2020 Emerging Leader in Health and Medicine by the National Academy of Medicine. She was also a winner of the 2020 Sloan Research Fellowship, in the category "Computational and Evolutionary Molecular Biology."

== Board memberships ==
Bhatt serves on the editorial board for Blood, Journal of Global Oncology, Seminars in Hematology, and The Oncologist.

In November 2020 Bhatt joined the Scientific Advisory board for January AI, a precision medicine company predicting long-term blood glucose level changes with artificial intelligence.
