= Molly Schumer =

American scientist

- Education: Reed College; Princeton University
- Known for: Biological hybrids
- Awards: 2019 Rosalind Franklin Young Investigator, Genetics Society of America 2018 Rising Star in Evolutionary Biology, Atwood Colloquium 2017 Women in Science Fellow, L'Oréal USA
- Scientific career
- Fields: Ecology, Evolution
- Website: https://schumerlab.com/

Molly Schumer is an American scientist who studies evolution, hybridization, and population genetics. She is an assistant professor of biology at Stanford University. She is a member of Stanford Bio-X and a Hannah H. Grey Fellow at the Howard Hughes Medical Institute.

== Education ==
Schumer completed her Bachelor of Arts in 2009 at Reed College, earning Phi Beta Kappa. She went on to pursue her PhD in Ecology and Evolutionary Biology at Princeton University (jointly supervised by Peter Andolfatto and Gil Rosenthal), finishing in February 2016.

After her PhD, Schumer worked as a postdoctoral researcher at Columbia University with Molly Przeworski before joining the Harvard Society of Fellows in July 2016, where she worked in the lab of David Reich. She became a Hanna H. Grey Fellow at HHMI in 2017, and was hired for her current assistant professorship at Stanford University in 2019.

== Research ==
Schumer's lab investigates biological hybrids and population genetics. Model organisms used in the lab are primarily fish and include the Gila topminnow, Xiphophorus (swordtail), and Julidochromis.

=== Key Publications ===
Schumer has authored or co-authored multiple publications that have been cited 100 or more times. As of January 2021, these include:

- "How common is homoploid hybrid speciation?" Evolution.
- "Parallel molecular evolution in an herbivore community," Science.
- "Phylogenomics reveals extensive reticulate evolution in Xiphophorus fishes," Evolution.
- "Natural selection interacts with recombination to shape the evolution of hybrid genomes," Science.
- "A serine cluster mediates BMAL1-dependent CLOCK phosphorylation and degradation," Cell Cycle.

== Awards, fellowships, and grants ==
Schumer won a 2019 Rosalind Franklin Young Investigator award from the Genetics Society of America and was named the 2018 Rising Star in Evolutionary Biology by the Atwood colloquium. She has received many other awards and honors, including:

- Milton Fund Awardee, Harvard University
- Women in Science Fellow, L'Oréal USA (2017)
- Theodosius Dobzhansky Prize, Society for the Study of Evolution (2017)
- Walbridge Award, Princeton Environmental Institute (2013)
- Graduate Research Fellowship (NSF-GRFP), National Science Foundation (2011-2014)
- Goldwater Scholarship (2007)
