= Cell adhesion molecule =

Subset of cell adhesion proteins

Cell adhesion molecules (CAMs) are single-pass transmembrane proteins, a subset of cell membrane proteins that are involved in the binding of cells with other cells or with the extracellular matrix, in a process called cell adhesion. In essence, CAMs help cells stick to each other and to their surroundings. CAMs are crucial components in maintaining tissue structure and function. In fully developed animals, these molecules play an integral role in generating force and movement and consequently ensuring that organs are able to execute their functions normally. In addition to serving as "molecular glue", CAMs play important roles in the cellular mechanisms of growth, contact inhibition, and apoptosis. Aberrant expression of CAMs may result in a wide range of pathologies, ranging from frostbite to cancer.

== Structure ==
CAMs are typically single-pass transmembrane proteins (bitopics) and are composed of three conserved domains: an intracellular domain that interacts with the cytoskeleton, a transmembrane domain, and an extracellular domain.

== Interaction modes ==
CAMs can mediate cell adhesion through homophilic interactions, in which molecules of the same type bind to each other, or heterophilic interactions, in which molecules of different types bind to each other. Interactions are called homotypic between cells of the same type and heterotypic between cells of different types.

== CAM families ==
There are four major superfamilies or groups of CAMs: the immunoglobulin superfamily (IgSF CAMs), cadherins, integrins, and the superfamily of C-type of lectin-like domains proteins (CTLDs). Proteoglycans are also considered to be a class of CAMs.

One classification system involves the distinction between calcium-independent CAMs and calcium-dependent CAMs. The Ig-superfamily CAMs do not depend on Ca^{2+} while integrins, cadherins and selectins depend on Ca^{2+}. In addition, integrins participate in cell–matrix interactions, while other CAM families participate in cell–cell interactions.

=== Calcium-independent ===
Immunoglobulin superfamily CAMs (IgSF CAMs) is regarded as the most diverse superfamily of CAMs. This family is characterized by their extracellular domains containing Ig-like domains. The Ig domains are then followed by fibronectin type III domain repeats and IgSFs are anchored to the membrane by a GPI moiety. This family is involved in both homophilic or heterophilic binding and has the ability to bind integrins or different IgSF CAMs.

=== Calcium-dependent ===
Integrins, one of the major classes of receptors within the ECM, mediate cell–ECM interactions with collagen, fibrinogen, fibronectin, and vitronectin. Integrins provide essential links between the extracellular environment and the intracellular signalling pathways, which can play roles in cell behaviours such as apoptosis, differentiation, survival, and transcription.

Integrins are heterodimeric, as they consist of an alpha and beta subunit. There are currently 18 alpha subunits and 8 beta subunits, which combine to make up 24 different integrin combinations. Within each of the alpha and beta subunits there is a large extracellular domain, a transmembrane domain and a short cytoplasmic domain. The extracellular domain is where the ligand binds through the use of divalent cations. The integrins contain multiple divalent cation binding sites in the extracellular domain). The integrin cation binding sites can be occupied by Ca2+ or by Mn2+ ions. Cations are necessary but not sufficient for integrins to convert from the inactive bent conformation into the active extended conformation. Both the presence of cations bound to the multiple cation binding sites is required, along with the direct physical association with ECM ligands for integrins to attain the extended structure and concomitant activation. Thus, rise in extracellular Ca2+ ions may serve to prime the integrin heterodimer. The release of intracellular Ca2+ have been shown to be important for integrin inside-out activation. However, extracellular Ca2+ binding may exert different effects depending on the type of integrin and the cation concentration. Integrins regulate their activity within the body by changing conformation. Most exist at rest in a low affinity state, which can be altered to high affinity through an external agonist which causes a conformational change within the integrin, increasing their affinity.

An example of this is the aggregation of platelets; Agonists such as thrombin or collagen trigger the integrin into its high affinity state, which causes increased fibrinogen binding, causing platelet aggregation.

==== Cadherins ====
Cadherins are homophilic Ca^{2+}-dependent glycoproteins. The classic cadherins (E-, N- and P-) are concentrated at the intermediate cell junctions, which link to the actin filament network through specific linking proteins called catenins.

Cadherins are notable in embryonic development. For example, cadherins are crucial in gastrulation for the formation of the mesoderm, endoderm, and ectoderm. Cadherins also contribute significantly to the development of the nervous system. The distinct temporal and spatial localization of cadherins implicates these molecules as major players in the process of synaptic stabilization. Each cadherin exhibits a unique pattern of tissue distribution that is carefully controlled by calcium. The diverse family of cadherins include epithelial (E-cadherins), placental (P-cadherins), neural (N-cadherins), retinal (R-cadherins), brain (B-cadherins and T-cadherins), and muscle (M-cadherins). Many cell types express combinations of cadherin types.

The extracellular domain has major repeats called extracellular cadherin domains (ECDs). Sequences involved in Ca^{2+} binding between the ECDs are necessary for cell adhesion. The cytoplasmic domain has specific regions where catenin proteins bind.

==== Selectins ====
Selectins are a family of heterophilic CAMs that are dependent on fucosylated carbohydrates, such as mucins for binding. The three family members are E-selectin (endothelial), L-selectin (leukocyte), and P-selectin (platelet). The best-characterized ligand for the three selectins is P-selectin glycoprotein ligand-1 (PSGL-1), which is a mucin-type glycoprotein expressed on all white blood cells. Selectins have been implicated in several roles but they are especially important in the immune system by helping white blood cell homing and trafficking.

== Function ==
The variety in CAMs leads to diverse functionality of these proteins in the biological setting. One of the CAMS that are particularly important in the lymphocyte homing is addressin. Lymphocyte homing is a key process occurring in a strong immune system. It controls the process of circulating lymphocytes adhering to particular regions and organs of the body. The process is highly regulated by cell adhesion molecules, particularly, the addressin also known as MADCAM1. This antigen is known for its role in tissue-specific adhesion of lymphocytes to high endothelium venules. Through these interactions they play a crucial role in orchestrating circulating lymphocytes.

CAM function in cancer metastasis, inflammation, and thrombosis makes it a viable therapeutic target that is currently being considered. For example, they block the metastatic cancer cells' ability to extravasate and home to secondary sites. This has been successfully demonstrated in metastatic melanoma that hones to the lungs. In mice, when antibodies directed against CAMs in the lung endothelium were used as treatment there was a significant reduction in the number of metastatic sites.

== See also ==
- Cell membrane
- Cell migration
- Immunological synapse
- Trogocytosis
