= Slip bond =

Type of noncovalent chemical bond

A slip bond is a type of chemical noncovalent bond whose dissociation lifetime decreases with tensile force applied to the bond. This is the expected behaviour for chemical bonds, but exceptions, like catch bonds exist.
