= Anne Brunet =

French professor of aging

- Born: Bellegarde sur Valserine, France
- Education: Ecole Normale Supérieure, BS and University of Nice, PhD
- Awards: NOMIS Distinguished Scientist and Scholar Award (2023)
- Scientific career
- Fields: Genetics, aging
- Workplaces: Stanford University School of Medicine
- Doctoral advisor: Jacques Pouysségur
- Website: web.stanford.edu/group/brunet/index.html

Anne Brunet (born on November 8) is a French geneticist who is the Michele and Timothy Barakett Endowed Professor and the co-director of the Paul F. Glenn Laboratories for the Biology of Aging at Stanford University School of Medicine. Her lab studies mechanisms of aging and longevity.

== Personal life ==
Brunet is from Bellegarde sur Valserine, France, uses red wine as an anti-aging strategy, and plays piano and violin.

== Education ==
Brunet received her BS in biology in 1992 from Ecole Normale Supérieure, Paris, France. She immediately began a PhD in the lab of Jacques Pouysségur at the University of Nice, France, which she completed in 1997. Between 1998 and 2003, she did her postdoctoral work at Harvard Medical School in Michael E. Greenberg's laboratory. She has been a professor at Stanford since 2004. She is a member of the editorial board for Genes & Development.

== Research ==
Brunet's lab works on discovering lifespan-regulating genes and their interactions with the environment. Next, she studies how conserved 'pro-longevity genes' (e.g. FOXO transcription factors) regulate longevity in mammals, the regenerative potential of stem cells, and the nervous system. She uses mammalian tissue culture and C. elegans as model systems to study longevity pathways, dietary restriction, and epigenetic (chromatin-state) regulation of longevity by the environment. In addition, she is developing the extremely short-lived African killifish N. furzeri as a new vertebrate model for aging.

The Chan Zuckerberg Initiative awarded a $525,000 research grant to Brunet, along with colleagues Ami Bhatt and K. Christopher Garcia, for their project "Analyzing how inflammation affects the aging brain."

Brunet received the 2022 Lurie Prize in Biomedical Sciences in recognition of work showing "how specific biochemical modifications of the protein structures around which an organism’s DNA is organized can extend its life and that of its descendants".
