= James H. Clark Center =

Coordinates: 37.43117°N 122.17445°W

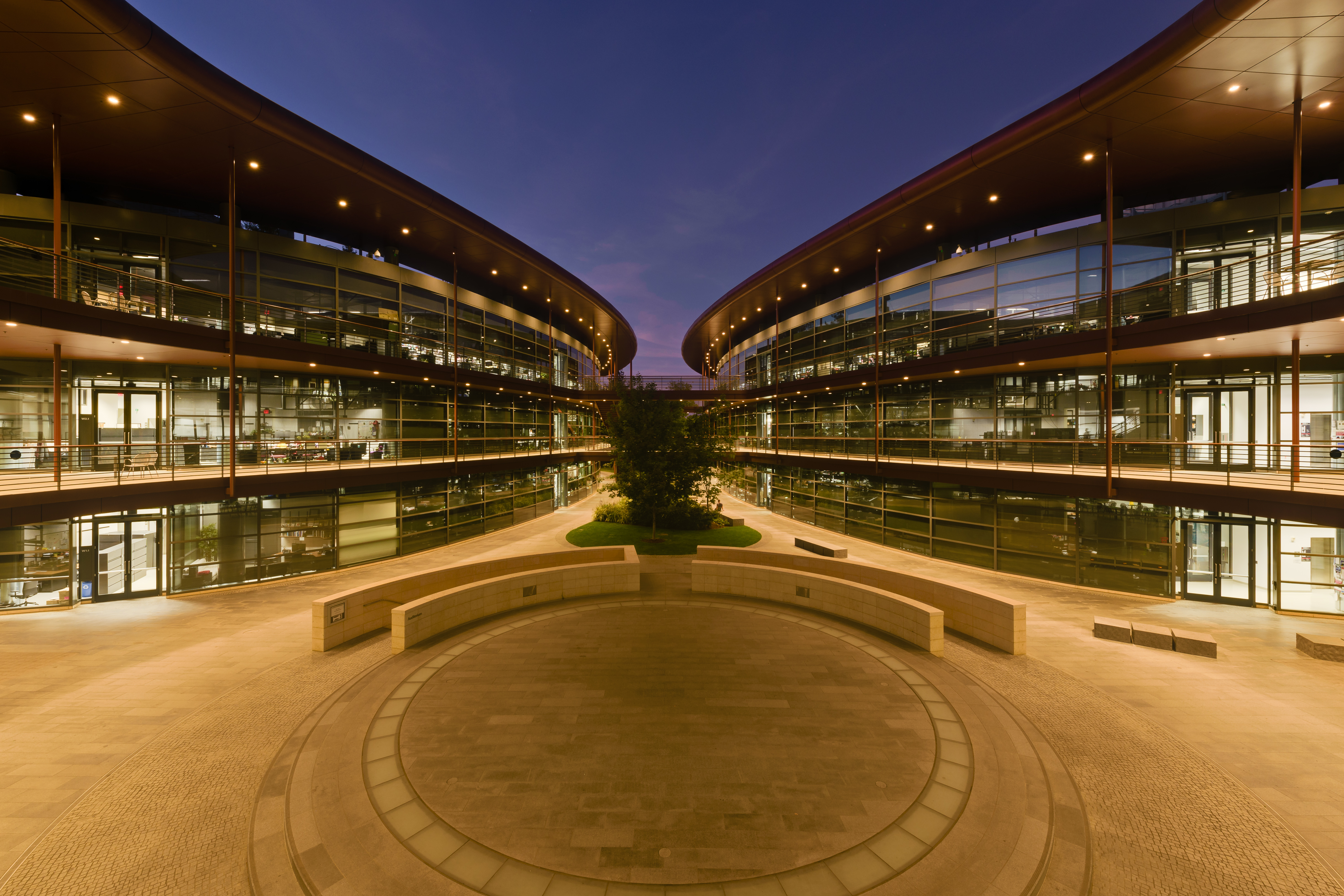
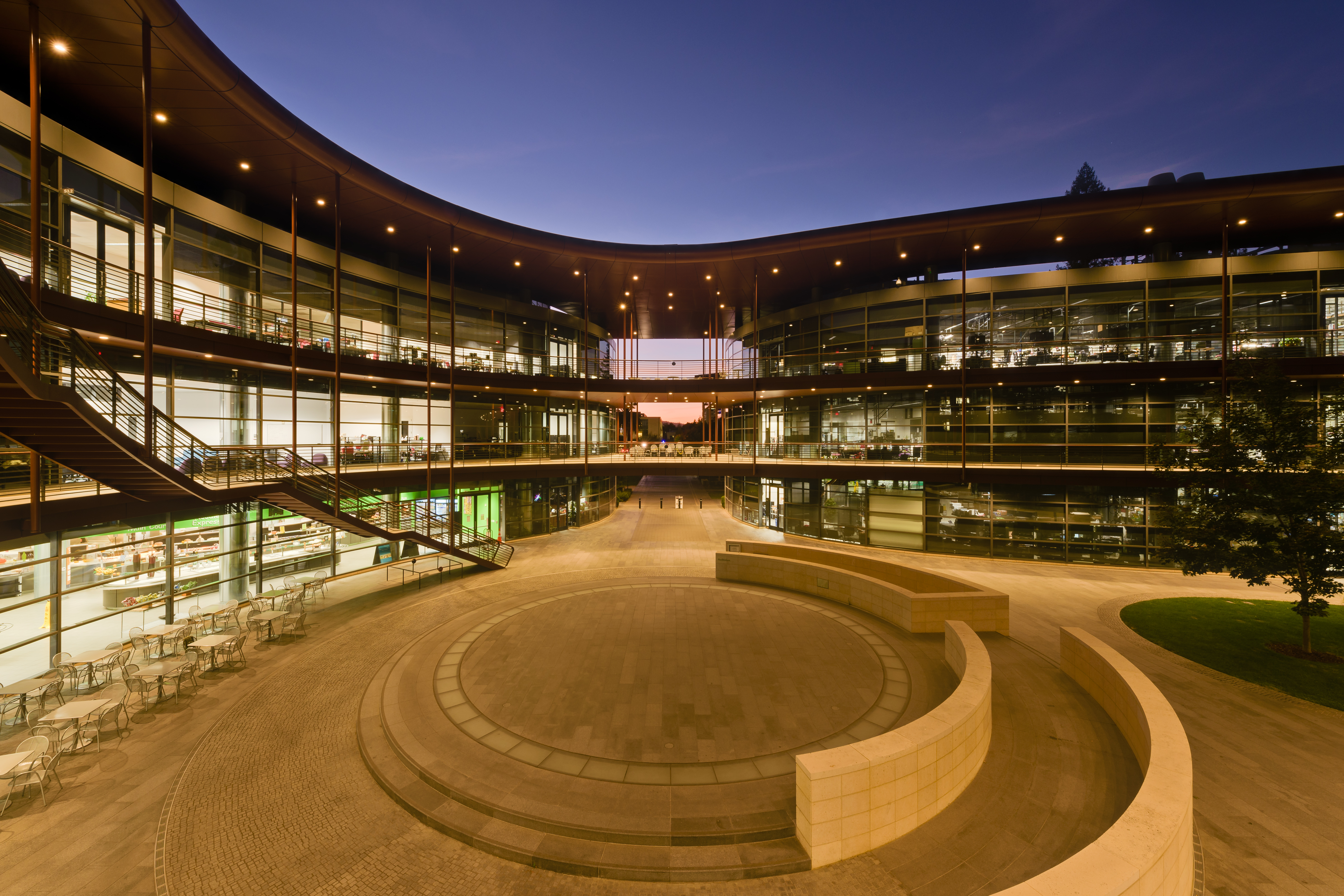
A view of Clark Center to the north (top) and to the west (bottom) at night.

The James H. Clark Center (also abbreviated to the Clark Center) at Stanford University, California, United States, is a building, completed in 2003, that houses interdisciplinary research in the biological sciences.

== History ==
The former Stanford computer scientist and entrepreneur James H. Clark donated $90 million of the total cost of $150 million to fund construction of the James H. Clark Center for interdisciplinary biomedical research. Construction started in 2001 and was completed in the summer of 2003, as part of the Stanford University Bio-X program. In September 2001, Clark rescinded $60 million of his initial 1999 pledge of $150 million to Stanford University for Bio-X, citing anger over President George W. Bush's restrictions on stem cell research. The building opened on October 24, 2003.

The building was designed by Foster and Partners in collaboration with MBT Architecture, and was funded by donations from James H. Clark and Atlantic Philanthropies.

== Tenants ==
The Clark Center is home to Stanford's Bio-X Program, which seeks to encourage researchers in the biological sciences to interact with researchers in other fields. It is a prime example of Stanford's interest in fostering a multidisciplinary approach to research.

Some of the researchers who are members of the Bio-X program include Robert Sapolsky, Ami Bhatt, Jonathan K. Pritchard, Molly Schumer, Natalia Gomez-Ospina, Lynette Cegelski, and Julie Baker.

== See also ==
- Dry Lab
