= Mehmet Aga-Oglu =

Azerbaijani-Turkish Islamic art historian (1896–1949)

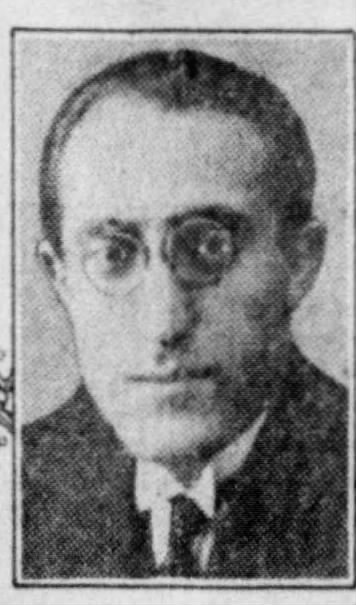
- Aga-Oglu in 1929
- Born: 24 August 1896; Erivan Russian Caucasia
- Died: 4 July 1949 (aged 52)
- Education: University of Moscow
- Occupation: Art historian

Mehmet Aga-Oglu (24 August 1896 – 4 July 1949), was an Azerbaijani-Turkish Islamic art historian. Born in Erivan, Russian Caucasia (today Armenia), Mehmet earned a doctorate history, philosophy, and Islamic languages from the University of Moscow. By 1921 he was at the University of Istanbul, where he studied Islamic art and Ottoman history. Whilst in Berlin, Aga-Oglu would study under Dr. Ernst Herzfeld in Near Eastern architecture.

In 1926 he earned a Ph.D. and in 1927 the Islamic Department of the National Museum in Istanbul appointed Mehmet as curator. In 1929, Mehmet was appointed by Wilhelm Valentiner to develop the Department of Near Eastern Art at the Detroit Institute of Arts, and published his first of several articles in the DIA Bulletin. 1933, he was made chair of the History of Islamic Art at University of Michigan, and was the first professor of Islamic art in the United States. Aga-Oglu was the first editor of the scholarly journal Ars Islamica, beginning in 1934. He would teach at the University of Michigan until 1938 as a Freer Fellow and Lecturer. Mehmet Aga-Oglu died in 1949.

== Publications ==
- Persian Bookbindings of the Fifteenth Century, Mehmet Aga-Oglu, University of Michigan Press.
- Dictionary of Islamic Artists, ed. Ernst Kuhnel, Gaston Wiet, and Mehmet Aga-Oglu.
- “Six Thousand Years of Persian Art”, The Art News, XXXVIII/30 (April 27, 1940), 7–19.
- Aga-Oglu, M. (November 1931). "On a Manuscript by Al-Jazari". Parnassus. 3 (7): 27–28. doi:10.2307/770698. JSTOR 770698. S2CID 164805944. JSTOR

== See also ==
- Weibel, Adèle Coulin (1951). "Mehmet Aga-Oglu (1896-1949)". Ars Islamica. 15/16. Department of the History of Art, University of Michigan: 267–271. JSTOR
- Simavi, Zeynep. 2012. "Mehmet Aga-Oglu and the formation of the field of Islamic art in the United States." Journal of Art Historiography. 1–25. https://repository.si.edu/handle/10088/19552
