= Natalia Gomez-Ospina =

Colombian physician-scientist

- Born: Medellín, Colombia
- Education: National University of Colombia; University of Colorado Boulder
- Known for: Medical Genetics; Hematopoietic stem cell transplantation
- Scientific career
- Fields: Pediatrics
- Thesis: The calcium channel CACNA1C gene: multiple proteins, diverse functions
- Website: https://www.gomezospina.com/

Natalia Gomez-Ospina is a Colombian physician-scientist who studies genetic disorders and lysosomal storage disorders. She was born in Medellín, Colombia. She is an Assistant Professor of Pediatrics (Genetics) and of Pediatrics (Stem Cell Transplantation) at Stanford University and works at Lucile Packard Children's Hospital. She is a member of Stanford Bio-X.

== Education ==
Gomez-Ospina studied petroleum engineering at the National University of Colombia before transferring to the University of Colorado Boulder, where she double-majored in Molecular, Cellular, and Developmental Biology and Biochemistry. She graduated summa cum laude.

She joined the Medical Scientist Training Program at the Stanford University School of Medicine and earned her MD/PhD in 2011. Her doctoral thesis was entitled, "The calcium channel CACNA1C gene: multiple proteins, diverse functions."

She spent a year in internal medicine at Santa Barbara Cottage hospital before pursuing a Dermatology residency at Johns Hopkins Hospital. She completed her residency in Medical Genetics at Stanford Hospital. Her post-doctoral work focused on hematopoietic stem cell transplantation in pediatrics.

== Research ==
Gomez-Ospina has published research in several academic journals, including The New England Journal of Medicine, Cell, Nature Communications, Nature Medicine, and the American Journal of Medical Genetics.

Her professional work includes point-of-care testing for children with disorders in their ability to regulate ammonia levels. With her colleagues, Gomez-Ospina has developed a handheld device to measure levels of ammonia in serum.
