= Lynette Cegelski =

American physical chemist and chemical biologist

- Education: SUNY Binghamton; Washington University in St. Louis
- Known for: Cell walls Biofilms; Antibacterial drug discovery Whole-cell and solid-state NMR spectroscopy
- Awards: PECASE; Burroughs Wellcome Fund Career Award at the Scientific Interface; NIH Director's New Innovator Award; NSF CAREER Award
- Scientific career
- Fields: Physical Chemistry; Chemical Biology
- Website: https://www.cegelskilab.com/

Lynette Cegelski is an American physical chemist and chemical biologist working to uncover and define the chemistry that underlies outstanding challenges in human health and sustainability. She is the Monroe E. Spaght Professor of Chemistry and, by courtesy, of chemical engineering at Stanford University. She is a Stanford Bio-X and Stanford ChEM-H affiliated faculty member.

== Education ==
Cegelski studied chemistry at SUNY Binghamton in New York and graduated summa cum laude and a member of Phi Beta Kappa in 1998. She then worked in the lab of Jacob Schaefer at Washington University in St. Louis (WUSTL), earning a PhD in Chemistry in 2004. Her post-doctoral work was in the laboratory of Scott Hultgren in Molecular Microbiology and Infectious Diseases at the Washington University School of Medicine.

== Research ==
Research in the Cegelski lab addresses pressing challenges in human health, sustainability, and the environment. The group's interdisciplinary work uses chemical tools to uncover how complex biological systems are built and controlled, from understanding bacterial cell walls and biofilms to discovering new molecular structures like phosphoethanolamine (pEtN) cellulose, and translating those insights into therapeutic and sustainable materials solutions.

=== Key Publications ===
Cegelski has authored or co-authored multiple publications that have been cited 100 or more times. As of January 2021, these include:

- "The biology and future prospects of antivirulence therapies," Nature Reviews Microbiology.
- "Morphological plasticity as a bacterial survival strategy," Nature Reviews Microbiology.
- "Small-molecule inhibitors target Escherichia coli amyloid biogenesis and biofilm formation," Nature Chemical Biology.
- "Conformation of microtubule-bound paclitaxel determined by fluorescence spectroscopy and REDOR NMR," Biochemistry.
- "Oritavancin exhibits dual mode of action to inhibit cell-wall biosynthesis in Staphylococcus aureus," Journal of Molecular Biology.
- "Mechanochemical unzipping of insulating polyladderene to semiconducting polyacetylene," Science.
- "Phosphoethanolamine cellulose: a naturally produced chemically modified cellulose," Science.

== Awards ==
Cegelski's work has earned her several awards:

- Presidential Early Career Award for Scientists and Engineers (PECASE)
- Burroughs Wellcome Career Award at the Scientific Interface, for "Mapping the structural and functional landscape of the microbial extracellular matrix."
- 2010 NIH Director's New Innovator Award, for "Structure, Function, and Disruption of Microbial Amyloid Assembly and Biofilm Formation."
- National Science Foundation CAREER Award, for "Form and Function of Bacterial Amyloid Fibers."
