= Mario Amzel =

Argentine chemist/biophysicist

León Mario Amzel
- Born: 25 October 1942; Buenos Aires, Argentina
- Died: 28 August 2021 (age 79)
- Education: University of Buenos Aires
- Awards: Teacher of the Year Award, Johns Hopkins University (1994)
- Scientific career
- Workplaces: Johns Hopkins School of Medicine
- Thesis: Cristalografía y termodinámica de cristales plásticos (1968)
- Doctoral advisor: Leo Becka
- Notable students: K. Christopher Garcia

León Mario Amzel (1942–2021) was an Argentine chemist, biophysicist, professor and former director of the Department of Biophysics and Biophysical Chemistry at the Johns Hopkins School of Medicine. He was known for his work in biophysics; structural biology; and assisting with the development of the first high-resolution images of how antibody-antigen recognition occurs.

== Early life ==
Amzel was born 25 October 1942, in Buenos Aires, Argentina, to immigrant parents from the Austro-Hungarian empire. His parents arrived in Argentina in the 1920s, and met in Buenos Aires. Amzel grew up in a working-class neighborhood with his parents and older sister. His father worked as a shoe cobbler and his mother helped run the store. Amzel grew up also helping in the shop.

== Education ==
For his primary and secondary education, Amzel attended public schools in Argentina.

Amzel completed his undergraduate studies at the University of Buenos Aires, where he studied chemistry. He then went on to pursue his doctorate at the University of Buenos Aires, and studied under Leopoldo (Leo) Becka. Becka had studied at the University of Leeds under D.W.J. Cruickshank, returned to the University of Buenos Aires after the overthrow of the Perón regime.

During Amzel's studies, in 1966, the Argentinian government was overthrown and the universities came under the control of the military. At one point, Amzel was jailed after the National Guard beat students and faculty who were considered to be in violation of the new university policies. These incidents came to be known as "La Noche de los Bastones Largos" ("The Night of the Long Batons").

While initially many students left the university system during this time, Amzel temporarily stayed, and worked in a lab at the Argentinian Atomic Energy Commission. However, in 1967, Amzel, along with faculty members from his department, temporarily went to Venezuela to continue with his studies at the Universidad Central de Venezuela. His advisor, Leo Becka, was considered instrumental in the arrangements, organization, and financing of the transfer research groups to other Latin American countries during this time.

In Venezuela, Amzel completed his thesis, and Ernesto Galloni served as his dissertation director. He ultimately graduated with a doctorate in physical chemistry in 1968. His thesis was titled "Cristalografía y termodinámica de cristales plásticos."

== Career ==
After receiving his PhD, Amzel accepted a position as a postdoctoral fellow at Johns Hopkins University beginning in February 1969, in the department of biophysics (now the department of biophysics and biophysical chemistry). From Venezuela, he contacted and was recruited to Johns Hopkins by Roberto Poljak, a fellow Argentinian. At this point, Amzel and Poljak were the only two Latinos in the basic sciences at the school of medicine.

In 1973, he become an assistant professor, and in 1978 he was appointment associate professor. In 1984 he achieved the rank of full professor at Johns Hopkins, and would remain at the university for the rest of his career. From 1978 to 1983 served as admissions director in the BCMB program, and in 2006, Amzel became director of the Department of Biophysics and Biophysical Chemistry at Johns Hopkins. He served in that position for 15 years, until May 2021, while continuing to lead his research laboratory.

Amzel's department also ran two programs that helped connected Baltimore public school students to labs and science education programming. He also help mentor young students through the science program.

== Research ==
Amzel's research focused on a variety of topics, including: antibody structure, peptide animation, redox enzyme chemistry and evolution, protein folding, structure-based drug discovery, ion channels and transporters, ATPases, and study of other enzymes. His lab also studied PI3K, a cancer-related protein, and how proteins regulate sodium channels in cardiac cells.

After stepping down as department head in 2021, Amzel remained an active researcher, and worked on developing computational methods to calculate the changes that occur when a protein recognizes another macromolecule or a small ligand.

== Awards and honors ==
- Teacher of the Year Award, Johns Hopkins University (1994)
- University Alumni Teaching Award (1999)
- Fellow, American Association for the Advancement of Science
- Fellow, the Biophysical Society
- Damon Runyon postdoctoral fellow
- Coleman Fellow in Life Sciences by the Ben Gurion University
- RAICES Prize from the Ministerio de Ciencia, Technologia e Innovacion Productiva, Argentina
- Honorary Professor, University of Buenos Aires

== Personal life ==
Amzel met his first wife at university, and the couple later divorced. Amzel had two daughters, and one granddaughter.
