= OmpA-like transmembrane domain =

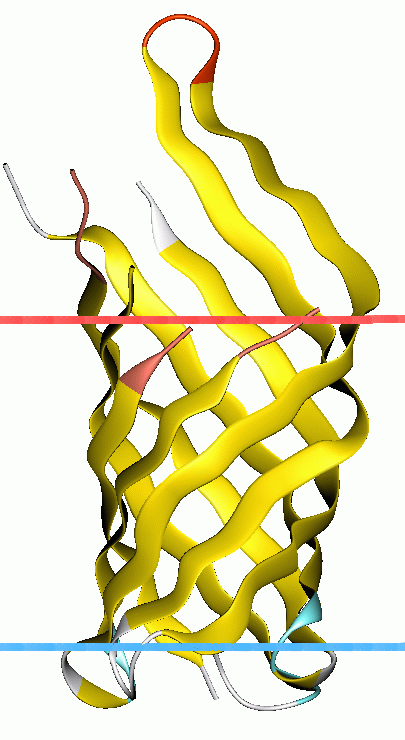

Identifiers
- Symbol: OmpA_membrane
- Pfam: PF01389
- Pfam clan: CL0193
- InterPro: IPR000498
- PROSITE: PDOC00819
- SCOP2: 1bxw / SCOPe / SUPFAM
- TCDB: 1.B.6
- OPM superfamily: 26
- OPM protein: 1qjp
Available protein structures:
- Pfam: structures / ECOD
- PDB: RCSB PDB; PDBe; PDBj
- PDBsum: structure summary
- PDB: 1g90A:22-195 1bxwA:22-192 1qjpA:22-192

OmpA-like transmembrane domain is an evolutionarily conserved domain of bacterial outer membrane proteins. This domain consists of an eight-stranded beta barrel. OmpA is the predominant cell surface antigen in enterobacteria found in about 100,000 copies per cell. The expression of OmpA is tightly regulated by a variety of mechanisms. One mechanism by which OmpA expression is regulated in Vibrio species is by an antisense non-coding RNA called VrrA.

== Structure ==
The structure consists of an eight-stranded Up-And-Down Beta-Barrel. The strands are connected by four extracellular loops and three intracellular turns.

== Function ==
Numerous OmpA-like membrane-spanning domains contribute to bacterial virulence by a variety of mechanisms such as binding to host cells or immune regulators such as Factor H. Notable examples include E. coli OmpA and Yersinia pestis Ail. Several of these proteins are vaccine candidates.

E. coli OmpA was shown to make specific interactions with the human glycoprotein Ecgp on brain microvascular endothelial cells. Cronobacter sakazakii is a food borne pathogen causing meningitis in neonates and was shown to bind fibronectin via OmpA and this played a significant role in invasion of the blood brain barrier. The Y. pestis protein Ail binds to laminin and heparin, therefore allowing bacterial attachment to host cells. The Borrelia afzelii protein BAPKO_0422, is an OmpA-like transmembrane domain and binds to human Factor H.

== See also ==
- OmpA domain
