= P-selectin =

Type-1 transmembrane protein

SELP
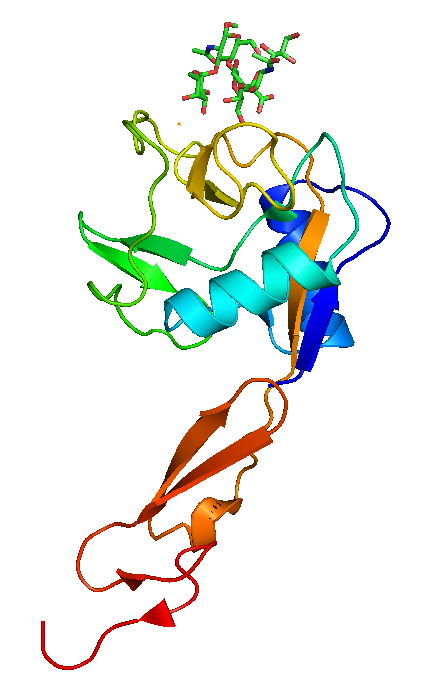

Identifiers
- Aliases: SELP, CD62, CD62P, GMP140, GRMP, LECAM3, PADGEM, PSEL, selectin P
- External IDs: OMIM: 173610; MGI: 98280; GeneCards: SELP
Available structures
PDB	Ortholog search: PDBe RCSB
PDB	List of PDB id codes 1FSB, 1G1Q, 1G1R, 1G1S, 1HES

Gene location (Human)
Chr.	Chromosome 1 (human)
Band	1q24.2	Start	169,588,849 bp
Band	1q24.2	End	169,630,193 bp

Gene location (Mouse)
Chr.	Chromosome 1 (mouse)
Band	1 H2.2|1 71.42 cM	Start	163,942,833 bp
Band	1 H2.2|1 71.42 cM	End	163,977,595 bp
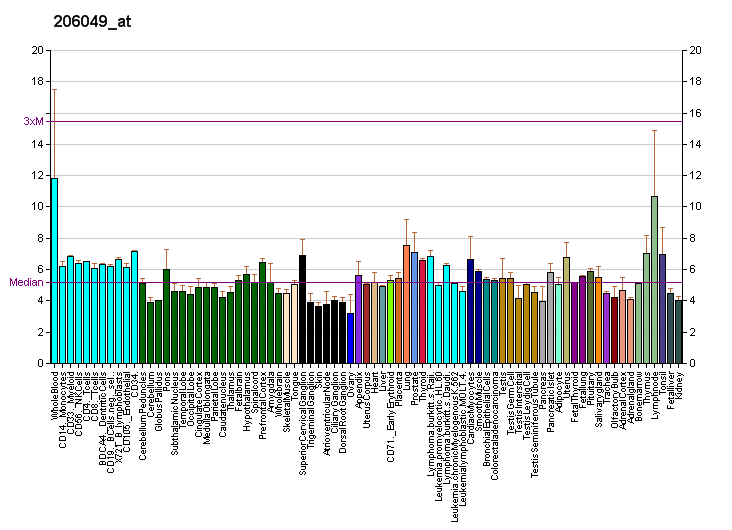
RNA expression pattern
Bgee	Human / Mouse (ortholog); Top expressed in: right coronary artery; monocyte; left uterine tube; olfactory zone of nasal mucosa; upper lobe of left lung; gastric mucosa; gallbladder; left coronary artery; canal of the cervix; appendix / Top expressed in: endothelial cell of lymphatic vessel; zygote; secondary oocyte; granulocyte; primary oocyte; blood; embryo; ankle joint; tibiofemoral joint; ankle; More reference expression data
BioGPS	More reference expression data
Gene ontology
Molecular function	heparin binding; oligosaccharide binding; lipopolysaccharide binding; calcium-dependent protein binding; glycosphingolipid binding; fucose binding; carbohydrate binding; sialic acid binding; protein binding; calcium ion binding; metal ion binding
Cellular component	integral component of membrane; membrane; platelet alpha granule membrane; platelet dense granule membrane; external side of plasma membrane; extracellular space; integral component of plasma membrane; plasma membrane
Biological process	leukocyte cell-cell adhesion; heterophilic cell-cell adhesion via plasma membrane cell adhesion molecules; positive regulation of leukocyte migration; platelet degranulation; regulation of integrin activation; cell adhesion; defense response to Gram-negative bacterium; positive regulation of phosphatidylinositol 3-kinase signaling; inflammatory response; calcium-mediated signaling using intracellular calcium source; positive regulation of platelet activation; leukocyte migration; response to lipopolysaccharide; calcium-dependent cell-cell adhesion via plasma membrane cell adhesion molecules; leukocyte tethering or rolling
Sources:Amigo / QuickGO
Orthologs
Databases	NCBI: entry; OMA: entry
Species	Human	Mouse
Entrez	6403	20344
Ensembl	ENSG00000174175	ENSMUSG00000026580
UniProt	P16109	Q01102
RefSeq (mRNA)	NM_003005	NM_011347
RefSeq (protein)	NP_002996; NP_002996.2	NP_035477
Location (UCSC)	Chr 1: 169.59 – 169.63 Mb	Chr 1: 163.94 – 163.98 Mb
PubMed search
- Wikidata
View/Edit Human	View/Edit Mouse

P-selectin is a type-1 transmembrane protein that in humans is encoded by the SELP gene.

P-selectin functions as a cell adhesion molecule (CAM) on the surfaces of activated endothelial cells, which line the inner surface of blood vessels, and activated platelets. In unactivated endothelial cells, it is stored in granules called Weibel-Palade bodies. In unactivated platelets P-selectin is stored in α-granules.

Other names for P-selectin include CD62P, Granule Membrane Protein 140 (GMP-140), and Platelet Activation-Dependent Granule to External Membrane Protein (PADGEM). It was first identified in endothelial cells in 1989.

== Gene and regulation ==
The gene SELP encoding P-selectin is located on chromosome 1q21-q24, spans > 50 kb and contains 17 exons in humans. P-selectin is constitutively expressed in megakaryocytes (the precursor of platelets) and endothelial cells. P-selectin expression is induced by two distinct mechanisms. First, P-selectin is synthesized by megakaryocytes and endothelial cells, where it is sorted into the membranes of secretory granules. When megakaryocytes and endothelial cells are activated by agonists such as thrombin, P-selectin is rapidly translocated to the plasma membrane from granules. Secondly, increased levels of P-selectin mRNA and protein are induced by inflammatory mediators such as tumor necrosis factor-a (TNF-a), LPS, and interleukin-4 (IL-4). Although TNF-a and LPS increase levels of both mRNA and protein in murine models, they do not appear to affect mRNA in human endothelial cells, while IL-4 increases P-selectin transcription in both species. The elevated synthesis of P-selectin may play an important role in the delivery of protein to the cell surface. In ischemic stroke patients, plasma P-selectin concentration was reported to be highly correlated to plasminogen activator inhibitor-1 activity and tissue plasminogen activator activity.

== Structure ==
P-selectin is found in endothelial cells and platelets where it is stored in Weibel-Palade bodies and α-granules, respectively. In response to inflammatory cytokines such as IL-4 and IL-13, P-selectin is translocated to the plasma membrane in endothelial cells. The extracellular region of P-selectin is composed of three different domains like other selectin types; a C-type lectin-like domain in the N-terminus, an EGF-like domain and a complement-binding protein-like domains (same as complement regulatory proteins: CRP) having short consensus repeats (~60 amino acids). The number of CRP repeats is the major feature differentiating the type of selectin in extracellular region. In human, P-selectin has nine repeats while E-selectin contains six and L-selectin has only two. P-selectin is anchored in transmembrane region that is followed by a short cytoplasmic tail region.

== Ligand ==
The primary ligand for P-selectin is P-selectin glycoprotein ligand-1 (PSGL-1) which is expressed on almost all leukocytes, although P-selectin also binds to heparan sulfate and fucoidans. PSGL-1 is situated on various hematopoietic cells such as neutrophils, eosinophils, lymphocytes, and monocytes, in which it mediates tethering and adhesion of these cells. However, PSGL-1 is not specific for P-selectin, as it can also function as a ligand for both E- and L-selectin.

== Function ==
P-selectin plays an essential role in the initial recruitment of leukocytes (white blood cells) to the site of injury during inflammation. When endothelial cells are activated by molecules such as histamine or thrombin during inflammation, P-selectin moves from an internal cell location to the endothelial cell surface.

Thrombin is one trigger which can stimulate endothelial-cell release of P-selectin and recent studies suggest an additional Ca^{2+}-independent pathway involved in the release of P-selectin.

Ligands for P-selectin on eosinophils and neutrophils are similar sialylated, protease-sensitive, endo-beta-galactosidase-resistant structures, clearly different from those reported for E-selectin, and suggest disparate roles for P-selectin and E-selectin during recruitment during inflammatory responses.

P-selectin is also very important in the recruitment and aggregation of platelets at areas of vascular injury. In a quiescent platelet, P-selectin is located on the inner wall of α-granules. Platelet activation (through agonists such as thrombin, Type II collagen and ADP) results in "membrane flipping" where the platelet releases α- and dense granules and the inner walls of the granules are exposed on the outside of the cell. The P-selectin then promotes platelet aggregation through platelet-fibrin and platelet-platelet binding.

P-selectin attaches to the actin cytoskeleton through anchor proteins that are still poorly characterized.

== Role in cancer ==
P-selectin has a functional role in tumour metastasis similar to E-selectin. P-selectin is expressed on the surface of both stimulated endothelial cells and activated platelets, and helps cancer cells invade into the bloodstream for metastasis and provides local multiple growth factors, respectively. Moreover, platelets facilitate tumor metastasis by forming complexes with tumour cells and leukocytes in the vasculature, thus preventing recognition by macrophages. This is thought to contribute to the seeding of tumour microemboli in distant organs. In vivo mice experiments have shown that a reduction in circulating platelets could reduce cancer metastasis.

The oligosaccharide sialylated Lewis x (sLe(x)) is expressed on the surface of tumor cells and can be recognized by E-selectin and P-selectin, playing on a key role in metastasis of the tumor. However, in the 4T1 breast cancer cell line, E-selectin reactivity is sLe(x) dependent while P-selectin reactivity is sLe(x)-independent, suggesting P-selectin binding is Ca^{2+}-independent and sulfation-dependent. One of the sulfated ligands is chondroitin sulfate, a type of glycosaminoglycan (GAG). Its activity in tumor metastasis has been probed by the addition of heparin that functions to blocks tumor metastasis. In addition to GAGs, mucin is of interest in P-selectin mediated tumor metastasis. Selective removal of mucin results in reduced interaction between P-selectin and platelets in vivo and in vitro.

Heparin has long been known to represent antiheparanase activity that is to keep an endoglycosidase from degrading heparan sulfate, one of the glycosaminoglycans, and to effectively inhibit P-selectin. Despite a striking effect of heparin on tumor progression shown in a number of clinical trials, the use of heparin as anti-cancer agent is limited because of its risk, which might induce adverse bleeding complications. Given those reasons, development of new compounds that target P-selectin is now emerging for cancer therapy. Among them, the inhibitory activity of semisynthetic sulfated tri mannose C-C-linked dimers (STMCs) to P-selectin was shown by the attenuation of tumor metastasis in vivo animal model, indicating the inhibition of interaction between tumor cell and endothelial cell is significant for blocking tumor dissemination.

== As a drug target ==
Crizanlizumab is a monoclonal antibody against P-selectin. which has now been approved by Novartis on November 15, 2019 for the indication of vaso-occlusive crisis in sickle cell patients.

== See also ==
- Selectin
