= Thomas A. McMahon =

American scientist and novelist

- Born: April 21, 1943; Dayton, Ohio, US
- Died: February 14, 1999 (aged 55)

Academic background
- Education: Massachusetts Institute of Technology; Cornell University

Academic work
- Discipline: biomechanics
- Institutions: Harvard University
- Notable works: Muscles, Reflexes and Locomotion

Thomas Arthur McMahon (April 21, 1943 – February 14, 1999) was an author and the Gordon McKay Professor of Applied Mechanics and Professor of Biology at Harvard University. He was born in Dayton, Ohio, and grew up in Lexington, Massachusetts.

A pioneer in biomechanics, McMahon studied terrestrial locomotion and the relationship of body size to shape and helped to develop devices for cardiac assistance and orthopedic biomechanics. He used simple mathematical models to explain complex phenomena and validated his models through experiments. His book Muscles, Reflexes and Locomotion is considered a classic on the mathematics, chemistry, biology, and mechanics of animal locomotion. His work with basilisk lizards showed how they run on water.

McMahon was the inventor of the "tuned track," a special springy running surface installed in Harvard's Gordon indoor track and tennis facility. Subsequent tuned tracks were installed at Yale University and at Madison Square Garden in New York and are credited with improving running times as well as cutting in half the number of injuries.

McMahon wrote four well-regarded novels, the last published posthumously. Loving Little Egypt won the 1988 Rosenthal Award from the American Academy of Arts and Letters. Characters in McMahon's novels are also credited with inventions, for example the odor amplifier.

== Novels ==
- Principles of American Nuclear Chemistry: A Novel (1970), Little, Brown and Company, ISBN 0-226-56110-0.
- McKay's Bees (1979), Harper & Row, ISBN 0-226-56111-9.
- Loving Little Egypt (1987), Viking Press, ISBN 0-226-56109-7.
- Ira Foxglove (2004), Brook Street Press, ISBN 0-9724295-3-0.
