= Adèle Coulin Weibel =

Swiss art historian

- Born: April 2, 1880; Lucerne, Switzerland
- Died: July 29, 1963 (age 83); Detroit, Michigan, U.S.
- Occupation(s): Art historian, curator
- Notable work: Two Thousand Years of Textiles: The Figured Textiles of Europe and the Near East (1952)

Adèle Coulin Weibel (April 2, 1880 – July 29, 1963) was a Swiss art historian and curator. She was a specialist in the history of textiles at the Detroit Institute of Arts from 1927 until 1963.

== Early life and education ==
Weibel was born in Lucerne, the daughter of lawyer and politician Josef Leonz Weibel. Her education was wide-ranging: she studied geology in Zurich, and art history in Bern, with further studies in Greek and English literature at the University of Oxford, and Near Eastern art in Vienna.

== Career ==
Weibel held various secretarial and assistant jobs while she was studying in the 1910s, including stints in Fiesole with Lady Sybil Cutting, and as a tutor employed by the Vanderbilt family in New York. She lectured in art history at the Metropolitan Museum of Art.

Weibel moved to Detroit in 1924, and led the city's Needle and Loom Guild for two years, working mainly with immigrant women skilled in traditional embroidery and weaving methods. She became curator of textiles at the Detroit Institute of Arts in 1927. She also oversaw pre-Columbian collections and was acting curator of Islamic Art in the 1930s. She gave public lectures on current exhibits. She also lectured at other museums. While in Detroit, Weibel taught courses at Wayne State University.

Weibel officially retired in 1949, but continued working at the institute under the title "Curator Emeritus" for more than a decade longer. "They took my job away from me, but they can't make me quit working," she told a 1951 interviewer.

== Publications ==
Most of Weibel's publications were reports on the Detroit Institute of Arts textile collections, for the institute's monthly bulletin. Her major work was her book, Two Thousand Years of Textiles: The Figured Textiles of Europe and the Near East (1952).

- "Italian Textiles" (1929)
- "Costumes of the Japanese Nó" (1929)
- "A Collection of Laces and Embroideries Fifteenth to Eighteenth Century" (1930)
- "Egypto-Islamic Textiles" (1931)
- "Eros Triumphant" (1935)
- "A Fragment of Hellenistic Wool Tapestry" (1936)
- "Persian Fabrics" (1936)
- "The Elsberg Collection of Peruvian Textiles" (1940)
- "Textile Art in Guatemala" (1941)
- 2000 Years of Silk Weaving (1944, exhibition catalog)
- "A Persian Silk Double Cloth" (1947)
- "Tapestries by Franz and Jacob Geubels" (1947)
- "The Fechimer Collection" (1948)
- "An Eighteenth Century Costume" (1949, with Francis Waring Robinson)
- "Three Brocades by Philippe de Lassalle" (1950)
- "Mehmet Aga-Oglu (1896-1949)" (1951)
- Two Thousand Years of Textiles: The Figured Textiles of Europe and the Near East (1952)
- "An Embroidery of the Eastern Orthodox Church" (1955)

== Personal life ==
Weibel married and divorced Swiss lawyer and politician Alois Moser; their daughter was artist Liselotte Moser. Weibel became a United States citizen. Moser painted a portrait of Weibel in 1934. Weibel died in 1963, at the age of 83. The Adèle Coulin Weibel Textile Department records are held by the Detroit Institute of Arts Research Library & Archives.
