= K. Christopher Garcia =

American scientist

Kenan Christopher Garcia
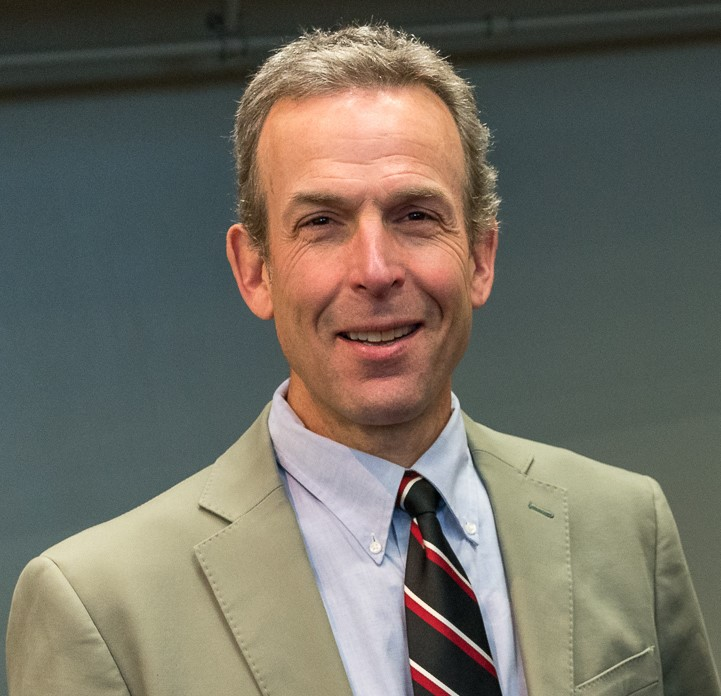
- Other name: K. Christopher Garcia
- Education: Tulane University, Johns Hopkins University
- Scientific career
- Fields: structural biology
- Workplaces: Stanford University
- Doctoral advisor: Mario Amzel
- Other academic advisors: David Goeddel, Tony Kossiakoff, Ian Wilson

Kenan Christopher Garcia (also known as K. Christopher Garcia) is an American scientist known for his research on the molecular and structural biology of cell surface receptors. Garcia is a professor in the Departments of Molecular and Cellular Physiology and Structural Biology at the Stanford University School of Medicine, an Investigator of the Howard Hughes Medical Institute and a member of the National Academies of Science and Medicine. In addition to his role at Stanford, Garcia is a co-founder of several biotechnology companies, including Alexo Therapeutics, Surrozen, and 3T Biosciences.

== Education ==
Garcia earned his B.S. in biochemistry from Tulane University. He attended graduate school at the Johns Hopkins University School of Medicine, where he received his Ph.D. in Biophysics under the mentorship of Mario Amzel. After receiving his Ph.D., Garcia conducted postdoctoral research at Genentech in the laboratories of David Goeddel and Anthony Kossiakoff, where he immersed himself in the nascent technologies of protein engineering and recombinant protein expression, and then at The Scripps Research Institute in the laboratory of Ian Wilson.

== Research career ==
Garcia's research integrates approaches in structural biology, biochemistry and protein engineering to understand how cell surface receptors sense environmental cues through the engagement of extracellular ligands, and transduce signals. The overarching theme of the laboratory is to elucidate the structural and mechanistic basis of receptor activation in systems relevant to human disease, and to exploit this information to design and engineer new molecules with therapeutic properties. Thus there is a close integration of basic science discovery with translation. Garcia's laboratory at Stanford has published numerous scientific articles describing the molecular structure and signaling mechanisms of proteins important for immunity, neurobiology and development.

=== Antigen recognition ===
Garcia's earliest research as a graduate student at Johns Hopkins University focused on understanding how anti-idiotyopic antibodies recognize peptide antigens. As a postdoctoral scholar at The Scripps Research Institute, Garcia conducted a groundbreaking study that revealed how T cells of the immune system survey peptides presented by major histocompatibility complex proteins (MHC), thus allowing them to distinguish between "self" and "non-self". Garcia's research led to the first visualization of a T cell receptor (TCR) bound to a peptide-MHC (pMHC) complex and was published in the journal Science in 1996. Garcia's 1996 article on the TCR-MHC interaction has had broad impact in the fields of immunology and immunotherapy.

At Stanford University, the Garcia Laboratory reported the structure of the pre-B cell receptor (pre-BCR) in 2007, which revealed how pre-BCRs oligomerize to signal in the absence of antigen. Garcia's group has also authored several additional landmark articles exploring various aspects of TCR-pMHC interactions, including the first structure of a γδ TCR-pMHC complex, the molecular basis for dual recognition of "self" and "foreign" MHCs by TCRs, insights into the germline basis of TCR/MHC interactions, the extent of cross-reactivity in the TCR repertoire, and elucidation of the structural trigger for TCR signaling. In Garcia's most recent work, his lab developed a peptide-MHC library technology that has enabled the discovery of antigens for orphan T cell receptors, such as those resident in tumors. This technology also enabled a breakthrough in understanding how signaling is initiated by pMHC engagement.

=== Cytokine signaling ===
Garcia's research has established how structural and biophysical principles govern receptor binding and signal activation in many different cytokine systems. Key findings include determination of the first crystal structures of the following cytokine family members in complex with their surface receptors: gp130 family (IL-6), common gamma (γc) family (IL-2), Type I Interferons (IFNα2/IFNω) and Type III Interferons. The Garcia Laboratory has also determined crystal structures of many other major cytokine-receptor complexes including those of IL-1, IL-4, IL-13, IL-15, IL-17, IL-23, LIF and CNTF. These structures have revealed a wide range of binding topologies and architectures, and demonstrate how convergent evolution has provided many solutions for cytokine receptors to transduce signals across the cell membrane. In addition to molecular studies of cytokines, Garcia's group has also used directed evolution to engineer high affinity cytokine variants (IL-2, IL-4, IFN-λ) with improved therapeutic properties.

=== Wnt signaling ===
In 2012, Garcia's laboratory determined the crystal structure of a Wnt protein in complex with its cellular receptor, Frizzled. The Wnt-Frizzled structure indicated that Wnts utilize a post-translational lipid modification to directly engage the Frizzled extracellular domain, which represents a highly unusual binding mode among soluble ligands. Garcia's study revealed a striking, donut-shaped architecture adopted by the Wnt-Frizzled complex that adorns the cover of the July 6th, 2012 issue of Science. More recently, Garcia's laboratory reported a breakthrough in being able to recapitulate canonical Wnt signaling using water-soluble bispecific ligands that dimerize Frizzled and Lrp6, which has important implications for the development of therapeutics for regenerative medicine.

=== Notch signaling ===
In 2015 and 2017, Garcia published articles in Science describing the first atomic-level visualizations of Notch signaling complexes. Garcia's group used directed evolution to strengthen low-affinity interactions between the receptor Notch1 and ligands Delta-like 4 (DLL4) and Jagged1 (Jag1) as a means of stabilizing the complexes for co-crystallization. Notch1-DLL4 and Notch1-Jag1 structures were determined by x-ray crystallography and revealed long, narrow binding interfaces assisted by multiple O-linked fucose and glucose modifications on Notch1. O-linked glycans are rarely observed at protein-protein interfaces, and their presence at the Notch-ligand interface explained how changes in glycosylation state influence Notch signaling activity. Garcia's 2017 publication also established that Notch-ligand interactions form catch bonds, and that Delta-like and Jagged ligands have different mechanical force thresholds for Notch receptor activation.

=== GPCR signaling ===
In 2015, the Garcia Laboratory reported the x-ray crystal structure of the virally encoded G-protein coupled receptor (GPCR), US28, bound to its chemokine ligand, fractalkine (CX3CL1). The US28-Fractalkine structure was one of the first reports to visualize a protein ligand bound to a GPCR, and revealed that the globular "head" of fractalkine docks onto the extracellular loops of US28, while fractalkine's flexible N-terminal "tail" threads into a cavity in the center of US28 as a means of fine-tuning its downstream signaling activity. In more recent studies, the lab has engineered biased chemokine ligands and shown that GPCR activation is governed by ligands that induce shape changes rather than highly specific bonding chemistries.

=== Cancer immunotherapy ===
Garcia has conducted several studies targeting cellular receptors for applications in cancer immunotherapy. In 2013, Garcia's group developed high affinity antagonists of the receptor CD47 that potently enhance the antitumor effects of established therapeutic antibodies. Garcia later determined that the therapeutic effects of CD47 blockade require combination therapy with checkpoint blockade antibodies in immunocompetent hosts, thus proving that CD47-based therapy relies upon stimulation of the adaptive immune system. Garcia's lab published the creation of an "orthogonal" IL-2 receptor complex to enable the selective delivery of IL-2 signals to engineered T cells during adoptive cell therapy. They also reported a new technology using yeast-displayed peptide-MHC molecules to identify tumor antigens recognized by Tumor Infiltrating Lymphocytes.

== Business activities ==
=== 3T Biosciences ===
The startup develops T-Cell therapy, which strengthens the immune system to fight cancer cells. The company relies on Garcia's research. Business operations are led by Luke Lee, a PhD student in cancer biology. The company’s principal investor is Asset Management Ventures, with additional involvement from a group of academics from Christopher Garcia’s biology lab at Stanford University, according to CNBC. Other known founders are Gee Marvin and Lee Sibener. The startup has a partnership with Boehringer Ingelheim. Most microsatellite stable colorectal cancers (MSS CRC) resist checkpoint inhibitors, like many other "cold" tumors. 3T Biosciences’ 3T-TRACE platform uses diverse target libraries and machine learning to find new shared TCR targets beyond the limits of traditional proteome-based methods.

== Video highlights ==
Garcia has published descriptions of several research findings online in the form of videos.

== Awards ==
- 1999 - March of Dimes Basil O’Connor Award
- 1999 - Frederick J. Terman Junior Faculty Award
- 1999 - Rita Allen Foundation Scholar
- 1999 - American Heart Association New Investigator Award
- 2000 - Cancer Research Institute New Investigator Award
- 2001 - Pew Scholar
- 2002 - Keck Distinguished Medical Scholar
- 2004 - Established Investigator of the American Heart Association
- 2012 - Elected to National Academy of Sciences
- 2013 - NIHMERIT award
- 2015 - Member of Mathematical Sciences Jury for the Infosys Prize
- 2016 - Elected to National Academy of Medicine
- 2024 - Passano Award

== Personal life ==
Garcia is a competitive long-distance runner and has run more than 120 ultramarathons, including several 100-mile races.
