= OmpA domain =

OmpA family
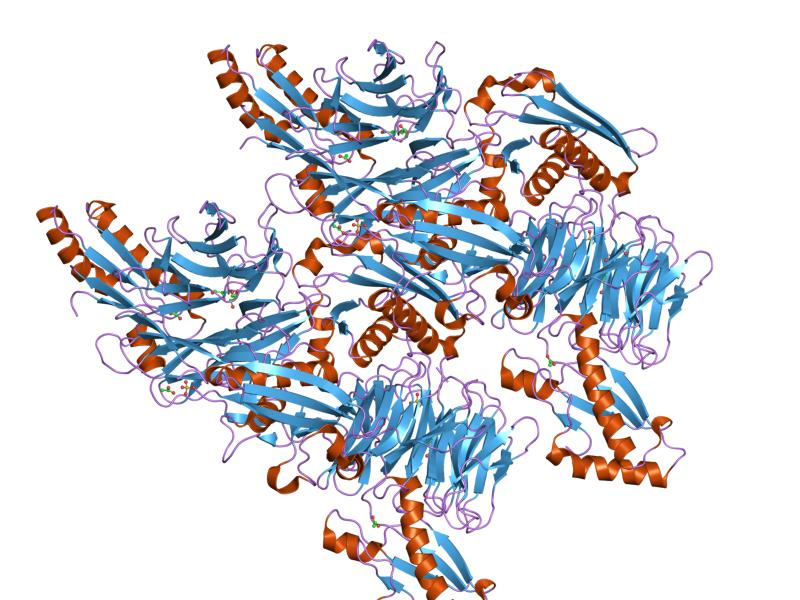
- crystal structure of tolb/pal complex

Identifiers
- Symbol: OmpA
- Pfam: PF00691
- InterPro: IPR006665
- PROSITE: PDOC00819
- SCOP2: 1r1m / SCOPe / SUPFAM
- TCDB: 1.B.6
Available protein structures:
- PDB: IPR006665 PF00691 (ECOD; PDBsum)
- AlphaFold: IPR006665; PF00691

In molecular biology, the OmpA domain is a conserved protein domain with a beta/alpha/beta/alpha-beta(2) structure found in the C-terminal region of many Gram-negative bacterial outer membrane proteins, such as porin-like integral membrane proteins (such as ompA), small lipid-anchored proteins (such as pal), and MotB proton channels. The N-terminal half of these proteins is variable although some of the proteins in this group have the OmpA-like transmembrane domain at the N terminus. OmpA from Escherichia coli is required for pathogenesis, and can interact with host receptor molecules. MotB (and MotA) serve two functions in E. coli, the MotA(4)-MotB(2) complex attaches to the cell wall via MotB to form the stator of the flagellar motor, and the MotA-MotB complex couples the flow of ions across the cell membrane to movement of the rotor.

== See also ==
- OmpA-like transmembrane domain
