= Endothelial activation =

State of endothelial cells in blood vessels

Endothelial activation is a proinflammatory and procoagulant state of the endothelial cells lining the lumen of blood vessels. It is most characterized by an increase in interactions with white blood cells (leukocytes), and it is associated with the early states of atherosclerosis and sepsis, among others. It is also implicated in the formation of deep vein thrombosis. As a result of activation, enthothelium releases Weibel–Palade bodies.

== Mechanical sensing and responses ==
Elevating shear stress induces a vascular response by triggering nitric oxide synthesis and mechanotransduction pathways of endothelial cells. The synthesis of nitric oxide facilitate shear stress mediated dilation in blood vessels and maintains a homeostatic status. Additionally, physiologic shear stress levels at the vessel wall upregulate the presence of antithrombotic agents through the mechano-signal transduction of mechano-recepting transmembrane proteins, junctional proteins, and subendothelial mechanosensors. Shear stress causes endothelial cell deformation which activates transmembrane ion channels Elevated wall shear stress caused by exercise is understood to promote mitochondrial biogenesis in the vascular endothelium indicating the benefits regular exercise may have on vascular function. Alignment is recognized as an important mechanism and determinant of shear-stress induced vascular response; in vivo testing of endothelial cells has demonstrated that their mechanotransductive response is direction dependent as endothelial nitric oxide synthesis is preferentially activated under parallel flow while perpendicular flows activates inflammatory pathways like reactive oxygen species production and nuclear factor-κB. Therefore, disturbed/oscillating flow and low flow conditions, which create an irregular and passive shear stress environment, result in inflammatory activation due to a limited alignment capability of the endothelial cells. Regions in the vasculature with low shear stress are vulnerable to elevated monocyte adhesion and endothelial cell apoptosis. However, unlike oscillatory flow, both laminar(steady) and pulsatile flow and shear stress environments are often considered together as mechanisms of maintaining vascular homeostasis and preventing inflammation, reactive oxygen species formation, and coagulatory pathways. High, uniform laminar shear stress is known to promote a quiescent endothelial cell state, provide anti-thrombotic effects, prevent proliferation, and decrease inflammation and apoptosis. At high shear stress levels (10 Pa), the endothelial cell response is distinct from upper normal/physiological values; high wall shear stress causes a promatrix remodeling, proliferative, anticoagulant, and anti-inflammatory state. Yet, very high wall shear stress values (28.4 Pa) prevent endothelial cell alignment and stimulate proliferation and apoptosis although the endothelial response to shear stress environments was determined to be dependent on the local wall shear stress gradient.

== See also ==
- Endothelial dysfunction
