= Ewald Weibel =

Swiss anatomist and physiologist (1929–2019)

Ewald Rudolf Weibel
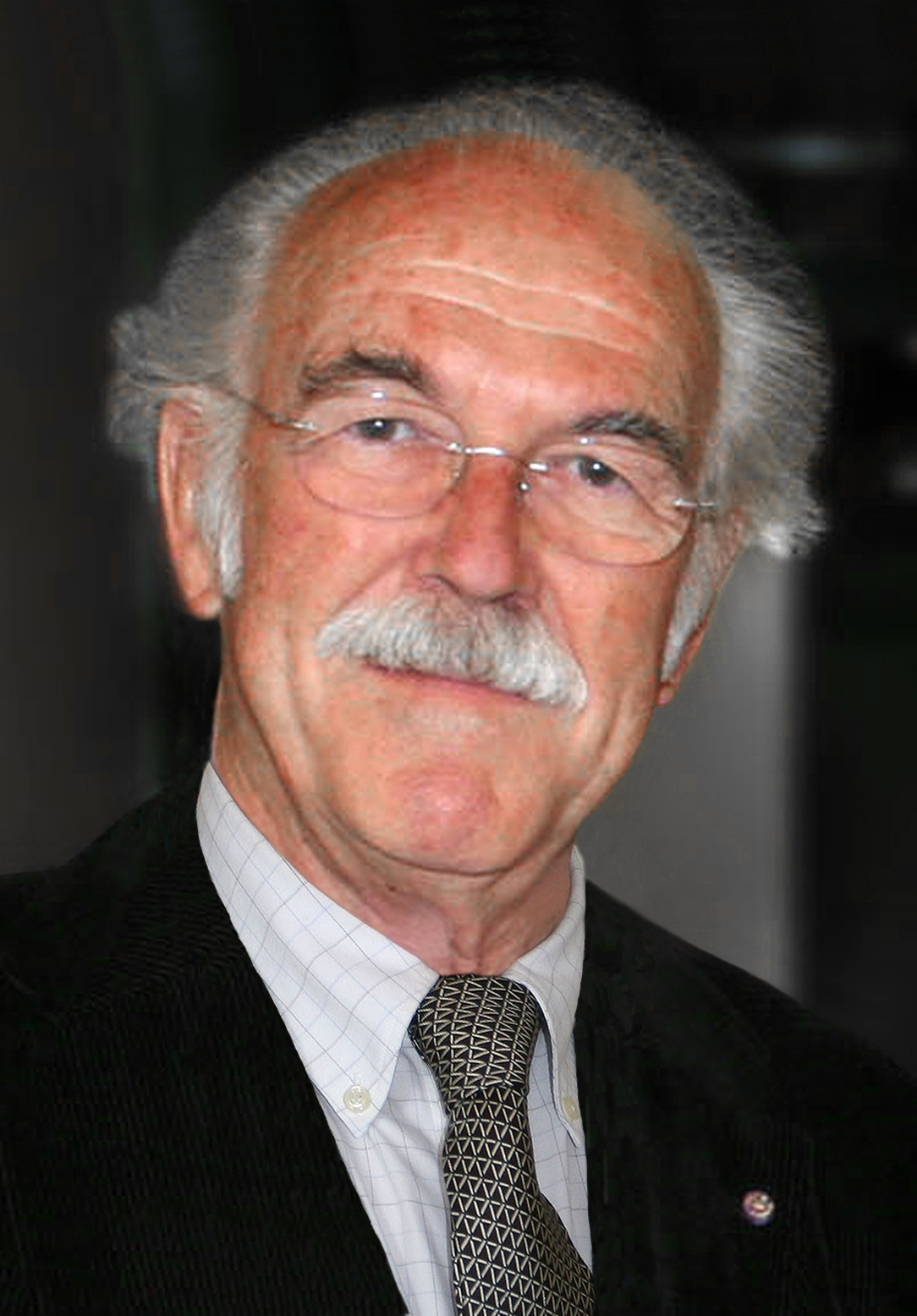
- Born: March 5, 1929; Buchs, Aargau, Switzerland
- Died: February 19, 2019 (aged 89); Bern, Switzerland
- Education: University of Zurich
- Known for: Weibel–Palade body Stereology
- Scientific career
- Workplaces: Columbia University; Rockefeller Institute; University of Bern
- Academic advisors: André Frédéric Cournand; Averill A. Liebow

Ewald Rudolf Weibel HonFRMS (5 March 1929 – 19 February 2019) was a Swiss anatomist and physiologist and former director of the Institute of Anatomy at the University of Bern. He was one of the first scientists to describe the endothelial organelles Weibel–Palade bodies, which are named after him and his Romanian-American colleague George Emil Palade. He was known for his work on the anatomy of gas exchange in lungs on multiple spatial scales using stereology.

== Education and career ==
Weibel was born in Buchs in the Aargau canton of Switzerland. After studying medicine at the University of Zurich (state examination 1955, Dr. med. 1956), he spent several years studying in the US at Yale University in New Haven, as well as at Columbia University and the Rockefeller Institute (now Rockefeller University) in New York, most recently as a career Investigator for the Health Research Council of the City of New York. In 1963 he returned to the Anatomical Institute of the University of Zurich as an assistant professor and in 1966 he was appointed full professor and director of the Anatomical Institute at the University of Bern until his retirement in 1994. He was Rector of the University of Bern from 1984 to 1985. From 1979 until 1996 he was Visiting Agassiz Professor and Associate in the Museum of Comparative Zoology at Harvard University. After his retirement, he was vice president and Secretary of the Maurice E. Müller Foundation for Orthopedic Surgery until 2000. He was founding president of the Union of Swiss Societies for Experimental Biology (1969–1972), President of the Swiss Academy of Medical Sciences (1996–2000) and President of the International Union of Physiological Sciences (1997–2001).

His scientific work covered four main areas: the morphometry of the human lung as the structural basis of the gas exchange function; the development of morphometric and stereological methods; the application of these methods in cell biology to measure the membrane system of the liver cell and the mitochondria in the muscles; integrative studies in comparative physiology, particularly on the question of the optimal structural basis of the organismic functions of the respiratory system, from the lungs to the muscle cells and their mitochondria, based on the hypothesis of symmorphosis. The discovery of the Weibel-Palade bodies in 1962 was an accidental observation. Ewald Weibel was married to the violinist and musicologist Verena Weibel-Trachsler.

== Honors and awards ==
Weibel was awarded numerous awards and accolades in life, a selected list is in the following.

- 1974: Marcel Benoist Prize
- 1979: Honorary Fellow of the Royal Microscopical Society
- 1979: Felix Fleischner Medal
- 1981: Foreign Associate of the U.S. National Academy of Sciences
- 1982: College Medalist, American College of Chest Physicians
- 1985: Fellow of the American Association for the Advancement of Science
- 1987: Anders Retzius Gold Medal, Karolinska Institutet, Stockholm
- 1987: Member of the Royal Society of Sciences in Uppsala
- 1988: H.R. Schinz Medal, Swiss Society of Radiology
- 1988: Honorary Degree of Doctor of Science, University of Edinburgh
- 1988: Member of the Polish Academy of Sciences
- 1989: Member of the German Academy of Natural Scientists Leopoldina
- 1992: Individual member of the Swiss Academy of Medical Sciences
- 1993: Jan Evangelista Purkinje Gold Medal, Prague
- 1998: Member of the Academia Europaea
- 1999: Honorary Doctor of Medicine, University of Geneva
- 1999: Honorary Foreign Member, American Academy of Arts and Sciences
- 2000: Honorary member of the Swiss Academy of Sciences
- 2004: Honorary member of the Swiss Academy of Medical Sciences
- 2005: Prix La Recherche with Bernard Sapoval & Marcel Filoche, Paris
- 2007: Educational Award, European Respiratory Society

== Bibliography ==
- Weibel, Ewald R. (1963). Morphometry of the Human Lung. Berlin, Heidelberg: Springer Berlin Heidelberg. doi:10.1007/978-3-642-87553-3. ISBN 978-3-642-87555-7. S2CID 43541365.
- Warwick, R. (1967). Weibel, Ewald R.; Elias, Hans (eds.). Quantitative Methods in Morphology / Quantitative Methoden in der Morphologie. Vol. 103. Berlin, Heidelberg: Springer Berlin Heidelberg. pp. 380–381. doi:10.1007/978-3-642-50130-2. ISBN 978-3-642-50132-6. PMC 1231782.
- Weibel, Ewald R. (1979–1980). Stereological methods. London: Academic Press. ISBN 0-12-742201-3. OCLC 5354366.
- Weibel, Ewald R. (1984). The pathway for oxygen : structure and function in the mammalian respiratory system. Cambridge, Mass.: Harvard University Press. ISBN 0-674-65791-8. OCLC 10020345.
- Nonnenmacher, T. F.; Losa, G. A.; Weibel, Ewald R., eds. (1994–1998). Fractals in biology and medicine Vol. I-II. Basel: Birkhäuser Verlag. ISBN 3-7643-2989-0. OCLC 29428836.
- Weibel, Ewald R.; Taylor, C. Richard; Bolis, Liana (1998). Principles of animal design : the optimization and symmorphosis debate. Cambridge: Cambridge University Press. ISBN 0-521-58370-5. OCLC 36817074.
- Weibel, Ewald R. (2000). Symmorphosis : on form and function in shaping life. Cambridge, Mass.: Harvard University Press. ISBN 0-674-00068-4. OCLC 42021561.
- Losa, Gabriele A.; Merlini, Danilo; Nonnenmacher, Theo F.; Weibel, Ewald R., eds. (2002). Fractals in Biology and Medicine Vol III. Basel: Birkhäuser Basel. doi:10.1007/978-3-0348-8119-7. ISBN 978-3-0348-9445-6.
