= Symmorphosis =

Physiological concept

Symmorphosis is the regulation of biological units to produce an optimal outcome. Symmorphosis is when a quantitative match of design and function within an organism defined within a functional system. Symmorphosis can be broken down into the three predictions that are required for organs to evolve within a species.

This proposes that if organs were matched structurally and functionally, and paired with the correct energy and minerals, the body would create an organ of optimal design. Some examples of this in the human body could be how the respiratory system distributes oxygen, how bones are structured to withstand stress, how blood vessels are designed to distribute blood throughout the body without using a lot of energy, or even how as a person becomes more physically fit or endures more cardio after their body has adjusted to maintain higher functioning demands. The use of symmorphosis can allow for fields of science to work with the field of evolutionary biology to better understand adaptation.

== Requirements ==
For symmorphosis to occur, there must be three predictions or guidelines in place and functioning at the same time. These three predictions work together to let an organ function or organ system work at full potential.

=== Structure ===
When looking at the theory of symmorphosis, one must consider if the design in the organism is fully optimized. The structural design in terms of symmorphosis means that the organ is designed to allow full capacity of its function and can allow for adjustments to occur when necessary. This design must contain the sufficient amount of economy material for the organ needed. In this circumstance, economy material is the careful management of resources such as tissues.

=== Capacity ===
The functional capacity is when all functional units work together to determine the maximal capacity. Functional capacity is overall determined by the structural design. Once the design is optimized in terms of biological materials, then the structure must be taken into account. The structure of an organ determines the maximal functional capacity and the adjustments required for morphogenesis—the process that causes an organism to create its shape—to occur.

=== Performance ===
The third prediction states that if prediction two works in intermediate steps to create a function of an individual organ, then each step also helps create the upper limit of the function." This means that if multiple units work together in multiple steps, they function together to create an upper limit (e.g., V_{o2max)} in terms of function or ability.

== Within the respiratory system ==
A common form of testing symmorphosis between species of mammals is to use comparative biology. The first system to use the proposed theory for symmorphosis is the oxygen pathway for mammals.

The original experimental method for symmorphosis was used to show if the design of the organs were relative to the static demands of the mammalian respiratory system. The respiratory system is a good example to study because it has one main function, the function has a measurable limit, the limit is variable, it has a sequence of structure, and each step of the sequence has functional parameters that are not fixed. A common pathway within the respiratory system is the oxygen pathway. This pathway is used because it is a good representation for mammals within most species—because it involves several organs that link together, and the overall function has a measurable upper limit. In particular, this testing helps identify structural elements that differ so they can carry the maximum amount of oxygen throughout the body.

=== V_{o2max} ===
The upper limit for the oxygen pathway is called the V_{o2max}. V_{o2max} is the maximal oxygen capacity that systems can take in, transport, and use oxygen. V_{o2max} can vary among individuals due to allometric variation (the differences in body mass), adaptive variation (differences in lifestyles), and the induced variation (amount of cardio exercise). Variation of any of the three types of variation should lead researchers to expect different parameters.

The oxygen cascade is one system with clear limits, and can help determine the V_{o2max} by components such as oxygen supply to the skeletal muscle mitochondria and the demand of oxygen by these skeletal muscle mitochondria. If oxygen is not transferred via skeletal muscle mitochondria, it can then be transferred across muscle capillaries.

== Evolutionary implications ==
Symmophsis can be use as an analytical advancement that helps other fields of science—such as biochemistry, physiology, and astronomy—work with fields such as cell, molecular, and evolutionary biology. Combining these fields helps researchers better understand past biological adaptions.

In evolution, natural selection can hinder the design when looking at the guidelines for symmorphosis. Natural selection can alter the phenotype to increase fitness of a species. In doing this, natural selection can cause adaptations that can change the optimal structural. When the optimal structural design changes, it changes the amount of economy material that must be used, which changes the predictions.

== Critiques ==
An issue with symmorphosis is the problem of having an optimal design for an organ if the organ contains multiple functions. An organ that performs multiple functions must compromise optimal performance of one function to perform another optimally. These complex components adding together dramatically decreases the chance that everything will optimally match. An example of this in mammals is the lungs. Researchers now claim that the lungs are an exception when considering the Lungs typically are only partially adjusted to maximal oxygen capacity in terms of adaptive and allometric variation and cause a fluctuation in these values.

In terms of symmorphosis, the capacity of each step of the oxygen cascade should match the demand of V_{max.} In most cases this theory holds true with the exception of when an individual exceeds the V_{max.} When V_{max} is exceeded there then becomes developmental constraints as well as design constraints in terms of symmorphosis. When this occurs there is an unmatched capacity, although they may be similar they do not align with the predictions for symmorphosis.
