= Pseudaminic acid synthase =

Identifiers
- EC no.: 2.5.1.97

Databases
- IntEnz: IntEnz view
- BRENDA: BRENDA entry
- ExPASy: NiceZyme view
- KEGG: KEGG entry
- MetaCyc: metabolic pathway
- PRIAM: profile
- PDB structures: RCSB PDB PDBe PDBsum
Search
- PMC: articles
- PubMed: articles
- NCBI: proteins

Pseudaminic acid synthase (EC 2.5.1.97, PseI, NeuB3) is an enzyme with systematic name phosphoenolpyruvate:2,4-bis(acetylamino)-2,4,6-trideoxy-beta-L-altropyranose transferase (phosphate-hydrolysing, 2,7-acetylamino-transferring, 2-carboxy-2-oxoethyl-forming). This enzyme catalyses the following chemical reaction

phosphoenolpyruvate + 2,4-bis(acetylamino)-2,4,6-trideoxy-beta-L-altropyranose + H_{2}O $\rightleftharpoons$ 5,7-bis(acetylamino)-3,5,7,9-tetradeoxy-L-glycero-alpha-L-manno-2-nonulopyranosonic acid + phosphate

The enzyme requires a divalent metal ion, preferably Mn^{2+} and Co^{2+}.
