= P-selectin glycoprotein ligand-1 =

Protein-coding gene in the species Homo sapiens

SELPLG

Identifiers
- Aliases: SELPLG, CD162, CLA, PSGL-1, PSGL1, selectin P ligand
- External IDs: OMIM: 600738; MGI: 106689; GeneCards: SELPLG
Available structures
PDB	Ortholog search: PDBe RCSB
PDB	List of PDB id codes 1G1S

Gene location (Human)
Chr.	Chromosome 12 (human)
Band	12q24.11	Start	108,621,895 bp
Band	12q24.11	End	108,633,894 bp

Gene location (Mouse)
Chr.	Chromosome 5 (mouse)
Band	5 F|5 55.59 cM	Start	113,956,597 bp
Band	5 F|5 55.59 cM	End	113,970,705 bp
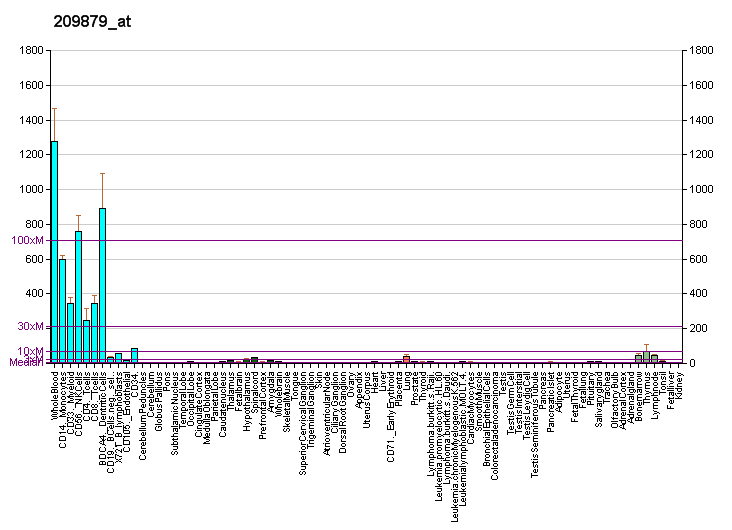

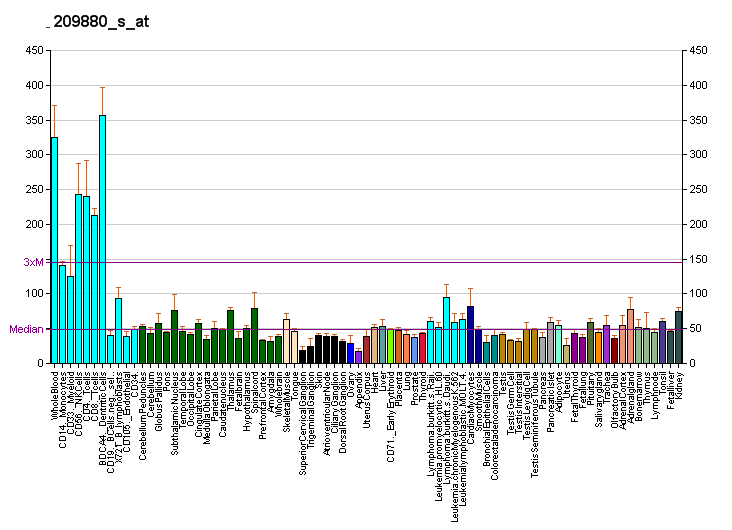
RNA expression pattern
Bgee	Human / Mouse (ortholog); Top expressed in: granulocyte; blood; mononuclear cell; monocyte; spleen; lymph node; inferior ganglion of vagus nerve; periodontal fiber; appendix; bone marrow cell / Top expressed in: granulocyte; thymus; tibiofemoral joint; mesenteric lymph nodes; bone marrow; spleen; blood; ankle joint; stroma of bone marrow; entorhinal cortex; More reference expression data
BioGPS	More reference expression data
Gene ontology
Molecular function	signaling receptor binding; protein binding; virus receptor activity
Cellular component	uropod; integral component of plasma membrane; integral component of membrane; membrane; plasma membrane; plasma membrane raft
Biological process	cellular response to interleukin-6; leukocyte adhesive activation; viral entry into host cell; viral process; cell adhesion; leukocyte migration; leukocyte tethering or rolling
Sources:Amigo / QuickGO
Orthologs
Databases	NCBI: entry; OMA: entry
Species	Human	Mouse
Entrez	6404	20345
Ensembl	ENSG00000110876	ENSMUSG00000048163
UniProt	Q14242	Q62170
RefSeq (mRNA)	NM_001206609; NM_003006	NM_009151
RefSeq (protein)	NP_001193538; NP_002997	n/a
Location (UCSC)	Chr 12: 108.62 – 108.63 Mb	Chr 5: 113.96 – 113.97 Mb
PubMed search
- Wikidata
View/Edit Human	View/Edit Mouse

Selectin P ligand, also known as SELPLG or CD162 (cluster of differentiation 162), is a human gene.

SELPLG codes for PSGL-1, the high affinity counter-receptor for P-selectin on myeloid cells and stimulated T lymphocytes. As such, it plays a critical role in the tethering of these cells to activated platelets or endothelia expressing P-selectin. Naive and stimulated lymphocytes appear to use PSGL-1 for trafficking into and out of lymph nodes. The gene and protein structure of human PSGL-1 was first discovered in 1993 by Dianne Sako. The research team at Genetics Institute (GI) named the molecule PSGL-1 for "P-selectin glycoprotein ligand-1" although it was found to also bind the other two selectins types. In 1994, the GI team then led by Gray Shaw discovered that most of the binding activity of PSGL-1 was localized within its N-terminal 19 amino acids, including three sulfotyrosines (Tys) at positions 5, 7 and 10 and a critical O-linked glycan attached to the threonine at position 16 of the mature, fully processed PSGL-1 present on a cell's surface. They termed this the "anionic segment" of PSGL-1 in 1995 and then published the co-crystal structure of human PSGL-1's anionic segment bound to human P-selectin in 2000.

The organization of the SELPLG gene closely resembles that of CD43 and the human platelet glycoprotein GpIb-alpha both of which have an intron in the 5-prime-noncoding region, a long second exon containing the complete coding region, and TATA-less promoters.

P-selectin glycoprotein ligand-1 (PSGL-1) is a dimeric mucin-like glycoprotein found primarily on the surface of white blood cells. PSGL-1 can serve as a ligand for P-selectin (P stands for platelet), which is one of a family of selectins that includes E-selectin (endothelial) and L-selectin (leukocyte). Selectins are part of the broader family of cell adhesion molecules. PSGL-1 can bind to each of the three members of the family but binds best (with the highest affinity) to P-selectin.

== Posttranslational modification ==
PSGL-1 protein requires two distinct posttranslational modifications to gain its selectin binding activity:

- sulfation of tyrosines
- the addition of the sialyl Lewis x tetrasaccharide (sLex) to its O-linked glycans

== Function ==
PSGL-1 is expressed on all white blood cells and plays an important role in the recruitment of white blood cells into inflamed tissue: White blood cells normally do not interact with the endothelium of blood vessels. However, inflammation causes the expression of cell adhesion molecules (CAM) such as P-selectin on the surface of the blood vessel wall. White blood cells present in flowing blood can interact with CAM. The first step in this interaction process is carried out by PSGL-1 interacting with P-selectin and/or E-selectin on endothelial cells and adherent platelets. This interaction results in "rolling" of the white blood cell on the endothelial cell surface followed by stable adhesion and transmigration of the white blood cell into the inflamed tissue. In 2000 it was reported that PSGL-1 can also be expressed on the surface of platelets, although at a substantially lower level than that seen on the surface of leukocytes.

== Clinical significance ==
=== In inflammation ===
The systemic administration of soluble recombinant forms of human PSGL-1 such as rPSGL-Ig or TSGL-Ig can prevent reperfusion injury caused by leukocyte influx after an ischemic insult to various types of vascularized tissues (IRI). The protective effects of soluble recombinant forms of PSGL-1, acting as pan-selectin antagonists, has been studied in multiple animal models of solid organ transplant and ARDS.

=== In cancer ===
In mice PSGL-1 acts as an immune factor regulating multiple T-cell checkpoints. Consequently, the antagonsim of PSGL-1 engagement and signaling has been proposed as a promising target for future checkpoint inhibitor anti-cancer drugs.

PSGL-1 has been shown to bind to VISTA (V-domain Ig suppressor of T cell activation) but this binding only occurs under acidic pH conditions (pH < 6.5) such as can be found in tumor microenvironments (TME).

In mice, PSGL-1 seems to facilitate T cell exhaustion in tumors. PSGL-1 deficient mice treated with anti-PD-1 antibodies show a dramatic reduction in the growth of melanoma tumors as compared with wild-type mice treated with anti-PD-1 antibodies. Treatments with either soluble recombinant forms of PSGL-1 (PSGL-Ig) or monoclonal antibodies that bind and block PSGL-1 also reduce tumor growth in mouse models, especially when combined with anti-PD-1 monoclonal antibody treatments. It has been noted that the abundant expression of PSGL-1, on the surface of so many different hematopoeitic cell types, causes a target-mediated drug disposition (TMDD) problem or crosslinking problems for antibodies that bind and target PSGL-1. The use of recombinant forms of PSGL-1 avoids the TMDD problem.

PSGL-1 is also a phagocytosis ("don't eat me") checkpoint molecule that is distinct from the CD47-SIRPα pathway. Deficiency or antagonism of PSGL-1 on cells (such as hematologic cancer cells) promotes their phagocytosis by macrophages.
