= Weibel–Palade body =

Storage granules of endothelial cells

Weibel–Palade bodies are the storage granules of endothelial cells, the cells that form the inner lining of the blood vessels and heart. They manufacture, store and release two principal molecules, von Willebrand factor and P-selectin, and thus play a dual role in hemostasis and inflammation.

== Etymology ==
Weibel–Palade bodies were initially described by the Swiss anatomist Ewald R. Weibel and the Romanian physiologist George Emil Palade in 1964. Palade won Nobel Prize in Physiology and Medicine in 1974 for his work on the function of organelles in cells.

== Constituents ==
There are two major components stored within Weibel–Palade bodies. One is von Willebrand factor (vWF), a multimeric protein that plays a major role in blood coagulation. Storage of long polymers of vWF gives this specialized lysosomal structure an oblong shape and striated appearance on electron microscope. The other is P-selectin, which plays a central role in the ability of inflamed endothelial cells to recruit passing leukocytes (white blood cells), allowing them to exit the blood vessel (extravasate) and enter the surrounding tissue, where they can migrate to the site of infection or injury.

Additional Weibel–Palade body components are the chemokines interleukin-8 and eotaxin-3, endothelin-1, angiopoietin-2, osteoprotegerin, the P-selectin cofactor CD63/lamp3, and α-1,3-fucosyltransferase VI.

== Production ==
Multimeric vWF is assembled head-to-head in the Golgi apparatus from tail-to-tail vWF dimers. vWF multimers condense and twist into long, helical, mostly parallel tubules separated by a less dense matrix of protein domains protruding from the tubules. The Golgi then buds off clathrin-coated vesicles which consist almost exclusively of vWF.

Immature Weibel–Palade bodies remain near the nucleus, where they acquire more membrane proteins and then disperse throughout the cytoplasm, carried along microtubules by kinesins. Clathrin-coated vesicles bud from immature Weibel–Palade bodies, reducing their volumes, condensing their contents, and removing select membrane proteins. Maturing Weibel–Palade bodies may also fuse with each other.

The only parallel organelle in physiology is the alpha-granule of platelets, which also contains vWF. Weibel–Palade bodies are the main source of vWF, while α-granules probably play a minor role.

== Secretion ==
Weibel-Palade bodies undergo a complex maturation process following their dissociation from the trans-Golgi network (TGN) which involves recruitment of a large number of membrane proteins. These include Rab GTPases such as Rab27A, Rab3B and Rab3D, Rab effectors and SNARE proteins, which together form the exocytotic machinery of Weibel-Palade bodies.

The small subset of Weibel–Palade bodies tethered at the cell periphery to the actin cortex serve as a readily releasable pool that's replenished by a larger pool of microtubule-associated bodies in the cell interior.

The contents of Weibel–Palade bodies are secreted by one of three mechanisms. Some undergo exocytosis individually in a rapid, sub-second fusion event, while others fuse transiently to the plasma membrane in a "lingering kiss" that opens a pore large enough for only their smaller cargo (e.g. IL-8, CD63) to diffuse out. In some cases this is accompanied by the formation of an actomyosin ring complex around the fusing Weibel-Palade body. Weibel-Palade bodies can also undergo compound or cumulative exocytosis, in which several Weibel-Palade bodies fuse sequentially into the same location at the plasma membrane. Finally, Weibel–Palade bodies may also coalesce into larger vesicles prior to exocytosis, called secretory pods, for multigranular exocytosis. Secretory pod formation is mediated by interposition of tiny nanovesicles between bodies. As Weibel–Palade bodies fuse together into secretory pods, their vWF cargo loses its tubular form for spaghetti-like strings that are then exocytosed through a fusion pore. Whether cargo besides vWF is exocytosed from secretory pods or selectively retained is uncertain. Different modes of cargo release from Weibel–Palade bodies may be a mechanism for differential release of subsets of molecules in different physiological conditions.

During secretion, the vWF molecules fuse together into the final concatamer "strings".

== Clinical significance ==
The importance of Weibel–Palade bodies are highlighted by some human disease mutations. Mutations within vWF are the usual cause of the most common inherited bleeding disorder, von Willebrand disease. VWD has an estimated prevalence in some human populations of up to 1%, and is most often characterized by prolonged and variable mucocutaneous bleeding. Type III von Willebrand Disease is a severe bleeding disorder, like severe hemophilia type A or B. VWF acts in primary hemostasis to recruit platelets at a site of injury, and is also important in secondary hemostasis, acting as a chaperone for coagulation factor VIII (FVIII).

== See also ==
- Endothelial activation
