= Reticular connective tissue =

Connective tissue composed of reticular collagen fibers

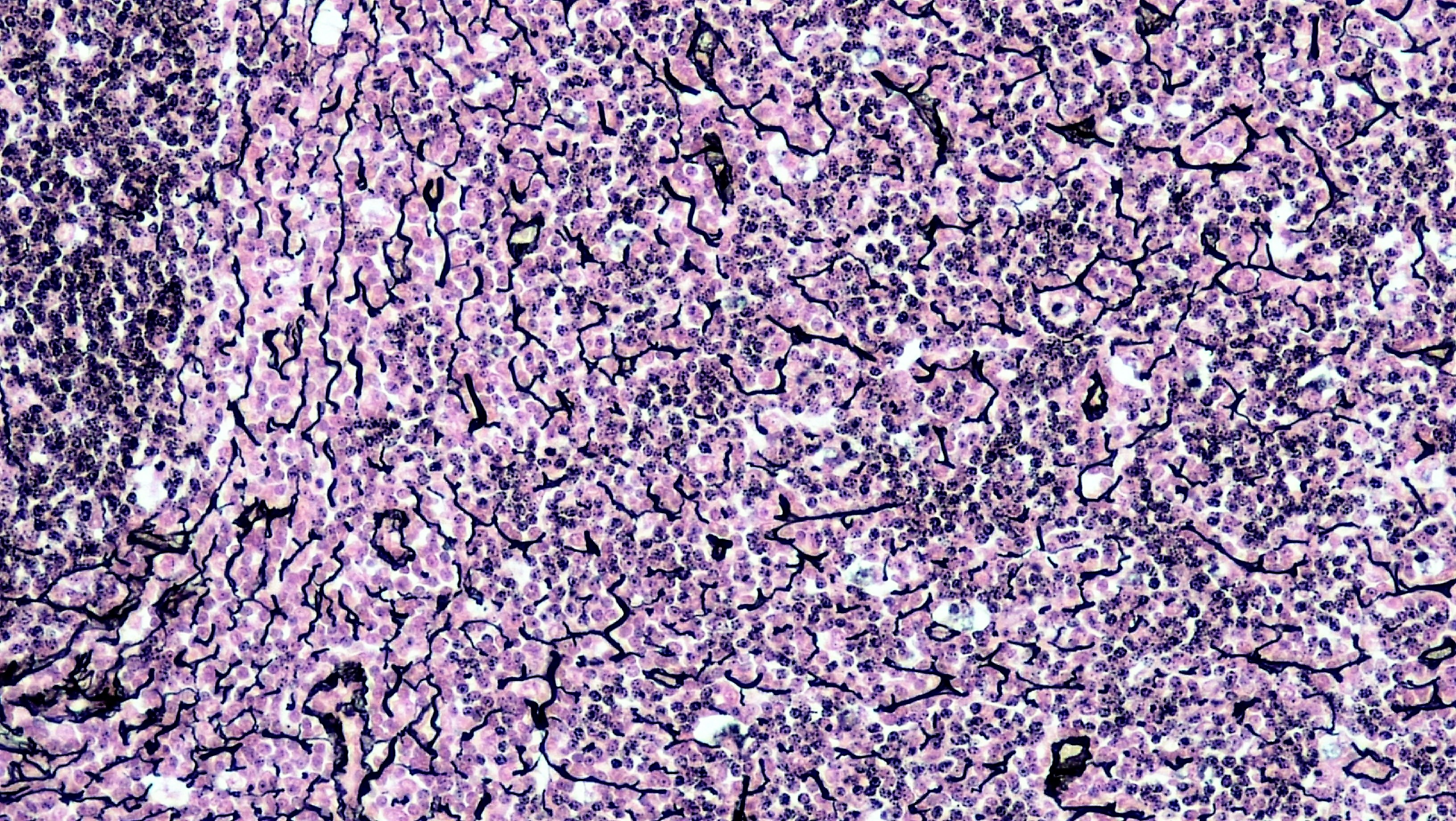
200X magnified cross section of “Connective Tissue: Reticular” from the Berkshire Community College Bioscience Image Library

In cellular biology, reticular connective tissue is a type of connective tissue with a network of reticular fibers, made of type III collagen (reticulum = net or network). Reticular fibers are not unique to reticular connective tissue, but only in this tissue type are they dominant.

Reticular fibers are synthesized by special fibroblasts called reticular cells. The fibers are thin branching structures.

== Location ==
Reticular connective tissue is found around the kidney, liver, the spleen, and lymph nodes, Peyer's patches as well as in bone marrow.

== Function ==
The fibers form a soft skeleton (stroma) to support the lymphoid organs (lymph node stromal cells, red bone marrow, and spleen).

Adipose tissue is held together by reticular fibers.

== Staining ==
They can be identified in histology by staining with a heavy metal like silver or the PAS stain that stains carbohydrates. Gordon and Gold can also be used.

== Appearance ==
Reticular connective tissue resembles areolar connective tissue, but the only fibers in its matrix are reticular fibers, which form a delicate network along which fibroblasts called reticular cells lie scattered. Although reticular fibers are widely distributed in the body, reticular tissue is limited to certain sites. It forms a labyrinth-like stroma (literally, "bed or "mattress"), or internal framework, that can support many free blood cells (largely lymphocytes) in lymph nodes, the spleen, and red bone marrow.

== Classification ==
There are more than 20 types of reticular fibers. In Reticular Connective Tissue type III collagen/reticular fiber (100-150 nm in diameter) is the major fiber component. It forms the architectural framework of liver, adipose tissue, bone marrow, spleen and basement membrane, to name a few.

== See also ==
- Deiters cell
- Reticular membrane of the inner ear
