= Lymph node stromal cell =

Lymph node stromal cells are essential to the structure and function of the lymph node whose functions include: creating an internal tissue scaffold for the support of hematopoietic cells; the release of small molecule chemical messengers that facilitate interactions between hematopoietic cells; the facilitation of the migration of hematopoietic cells; the presentation of antigens to immune cells at the initiation of the adaptive immune system; and the homeostasis of lymphocyte numbers. Stromal cells originate from multipotent mesenchymal stem cells.

== Structure ==
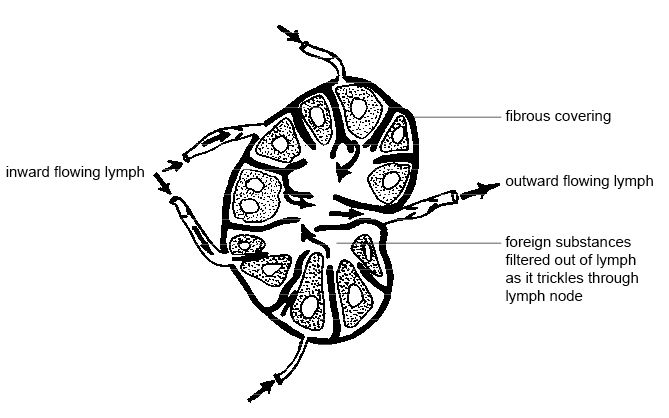
Diagram of a lymph node.

Lymph nodes are enclosed in an external fibrous capsule, from which thin walls of sinew called trabeculae penetrate into the lymph node, partially dividing it. Beneath the external capsule and along the courses of the trabeculae, are peritrabecular and subcapsular sinuses. These sinuses are cavities containing macrophages (specialised cells which help to keep the extracellular matrix in order).

The interior of the lymph node has two regions: the cortex and the medulla. In the cortex, lymphoid tissue is organized into nodules. In the nodules, T lymphocytes are located in the T cell zone. B lymphocytes are located in the B cell follicle. The primary B cell follicle matures in germinal centers. In the medulla are hematopoietic cells (which contribute to the formation of the blood) and stromal cells.

Near the medulla is the hilum of lymph node. This is the place where blood vessels enter and leave the lymph node and lymphatic vessels leave the lymph node. Lymph vessels entering the node do so along the perimeter (outer surface).

== Function ==
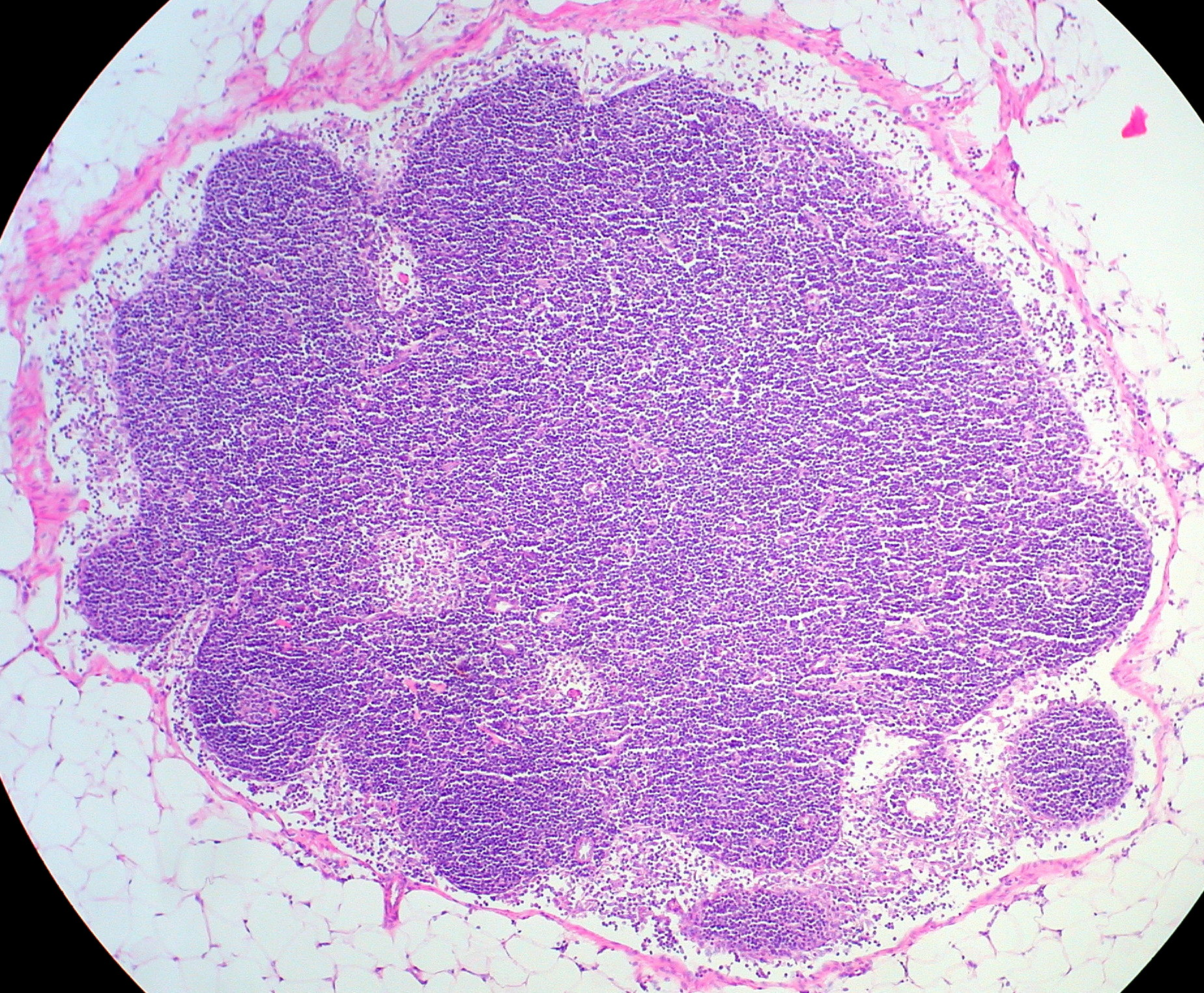
Histological section of a normal lymph node

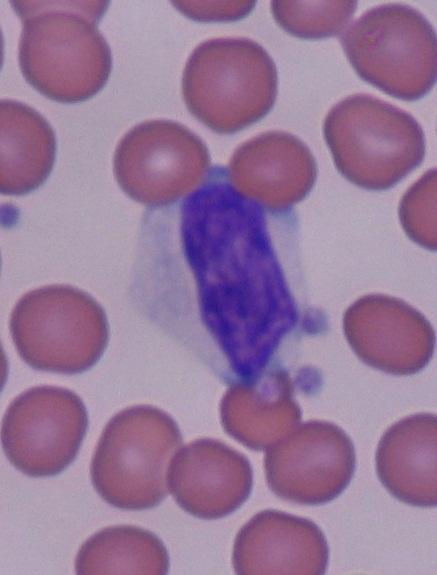
Lymphocyte surrounded by red blood cells.

The lymph nodes, the spleen and Peyer's patches, together are known as secondary lymphoid organs. Lymph nodes are found between lymphatic ducts and blood vessels. Afferent lymphatic vessels bring lymph fluid from the peripheral tissues to the lymph nodes. The lymph tissue in the lymph nodes consists of immune cells (95%), for example lymphocytes, and stromal cells (1% to 5%) The genesis of lymph nodes begins within the blood and the lymphatic system. Interactions between stromal and hematopoietic cells are important for the development of lymph nodes. Crosstalk LEC, lymphoid tissue inducer cells and mesenchymal stromal organizer cells initiate the formation of lymph nodes.

Naive lymphocytes (those with no history of contact with antigens) travel from the bone marrow or high endothelial venules of the thymus where they develop as lymphoblasts, to lymph nodes, where they mature.

The primary role of lymph node stromal cells is structural. They form a scaffold for hematopoietic cells and assist their movement along it. The molecular signaling systems (chemokines) that distribute lymphocytes to appropriate localities within the lymph node (T and B cell segregation) are also created by lymph node stromal cells. Lymphocytes have receptors for such chemokines. For example, Naive T cells express the CCR7 receptor for the chemokine CCL21. and B cells exhibit CXCR5 receptors for chemokine CXCL13.

The lymph from the peripheral tissues contains soluble antigens and arrives at the lymph node via afferent lymphatic vessels. An adaptive immune response takes place in response to the presence of the antigen in the lymph node. Antigen-presenting cells accumulate near high endothelial venules to process soluble antigens. Antigens are also present on the surface of dendritic cells.

In an inflammatory state, lymphatic endothelial cells increase their surface adhesion molecules, and dendritic cells express a surface CCR7 receptor. This type of receptor interacts with the chemokine CCL21, produced by fibroblastic reticular cells. Due to this interaction, dendritic cells move to the T cell zone or to the B cell follicle along the fibroblast reticular cell network. Dendritic cells exhibit C-type lectin receptors (CLEC-2), which bind to gp38 on the surface of lymphatic endothelial cells.

Lymphocytes leave the lymph node, as effector immune cells, via the efferent lymph vessels. Their numbers compensate for the removal of dead peripheral lymphocytes. B and T lymphocytes leave the lymph node based on changes in concentration of sphingosine-1-phosphate (S1P). The concentration of S1P in the lymph node is maintained at a level lower than that of the blood or the lymph under the influence of S1P lyase. This means immune cells may leave the lymph node along a chemokine gradient.

Most T cells are, in time, eliminated in the thymus by a process of clonal deletion. However, some of them escape this process and are then "mopped up" in the lymph nodes. Lymph node stromal cells express peripheral tissue-restricted antigens (PTAs) on their surface. The Transcription factor Aire (autoimmune regulator) that controls the expression of PTAs on mTEC cells in the thymus is only expressed at low levels by uncharacterized double negative stromal cells. Most lymph node stromal cells preferentially express DF1, an Aire-like transcription modulator.

== Types of lymph node stromal cells ==
Lymph node stromal cells can be grouped into six sub-populations, known by their expression of surface markers. The sub-populations include: fibroblastic reticular cells (FRCs); folicular dendritic cells (FDCs); lymphatic endothelial cells (LECs); blood endothelial cells (BECs); alpha-7 integrin pericytes (AIPs); and double negative cells (DNCs). The surface markers include: glycoprotein CD31 and glycoprotein podoplanin GP38. The different sub-populations are also known by their production of small molecules; where they are located; and their function. Most also express common markers such as desmin, laminin, various subunits of integrins, vascular cell adhesion molecule 1 (VCAM-1) and mucosal vascular addressin cell adhesion molecule 1 (MAdCAM-1).

Surface markers
	CD 31 +	CD 31 -	GP 38 +	GP 38 -	ITGA7 +
FRC	No	Yes	Yes	No	-
FDC	No	Yes	Yes	Yes	-
LEC	Yes	No	Yes	No	-
BEC	Low	-	No	Yes	-
AIP	No	Yes	No	Yes	Yes
DNC	-	-	-	-	-

=== Fibroblastic reticular cells ===
Fibroblastic reticular cells (FRCs) are located in the T cell zone of the cortex. FRCs produce collagen alpha-1(III) rich reticular fibers that form a dense network within the lymphoid tissue. These are connected by collagen XIV, small leucine-rich proteoglycans and lysyl oxidase. The network of fibers supports and guides the movement of dendritic cells (DCs), T lymphocytes and B lymphocytes. It also creates a porous molecular sieve in the lymph node.

The lymph carries chemokines (molecular chemical messengers) and antigens to the lymph node. At the lymph node, the lymph passes quickly through the reticular network to the T cell zone and the high endothelial venules. FRCs express chemokines such as CCL21 and CCL19 which assist the movement of T cells and dendritic cells with CCR7 receptors.

FRCs also produce components of extracellular matrix, such as ER-TR7, fibrillin, laminin, fibronectin and intracellular components such as desmin and α-actin smooth muscle that may influence the formation of the reticular fiber network. For example, the chemokine CCL21 attaches to the surface of the FRCs through collagen and glycosaminoglycan molecules.

FRCs express cytokine IL-7, a regulator of the survival of resting T lymphocytes.

=== Follicular dendritic cells ===
Follicular dendritic cells (FDCs) are found in the center of B lymphocyte follicles. They form a dense network of cellular filaments. They also express the Fc receptors, CD16, CD23 and CD32; the complement receptors CD21 and CD35 and complement components. The network of cellular filaments and receptors help the FDCs capture antigens as immune complexes and present them to other immune cells.

FDCs assist the development of the germinal center via an interaction with B lymphocytes and helper T-lymphocytes. B lymphocytes proliferate and differentiate into plasma cells and memory cells. FDCs produce chemokine CXCL13 which promotes migration of B lymphocytes to the primary B cell follicle. B lymphocytes need a factor B cell activating factor (BAFF) for their survival, also produced by FDCs.

=== Marginal reticular cells ===
Marginal reticular cells (MRCs) form a layer of cells beneath the subcapsular sinuses. Via the reticular network, the MRCs bring antigens from the sub-capsular sinuses to the B cell follicles. MRCs express the molecule TRANCE (also known as RANKL), a type of tumor necrosis factor. They are one of organizer cells involved in the formation of the structure of lymph node during organogenesis. They express CXCL13 at the edges of B cell follicles.

=== Lymphatic endothelial cells ===
Lymphatic endothelial cells (LECs) line lymphatic vessels. They express adhesion molecules, chemokine CCL21, and lymphatic vessel endothelial hyaluronan receptor-1 (LYVE1), a homologue of CD44. These molecules allow the entry of hematopoietic cells into the lymphatic vessels. During an inflammatory state, the numbers of adhesion molecules on the surfaces of LECs increase.

=== High endothelial cells ===
High endothelial cells (HECs) are specialized vascular endothelial cells. In the thymus, they line the high endothelial venules (HEVs) where lymphocytes originate. The HEVs of the lymph node express adhesion molecules like peripheral node addressin (PNAd) that are essential for the migration of naive T cells from the peripheral blood to the lymph node. In mouse lymph nodes the HECs also express the chemokine CCL21 which will bind its receptor CCR7 on the naive T-cell and enhance the migration.

=== Alpha-7 integrin pericytes ===
Alpha-7 integrin pericytes (AIPs) express several types of integrin chains which generate heterodimers. Integrin chains allow integrin pericytes to interact with hematopoietic cells and promote their migration.

== Malignancy ==
Lymph node stromal cells can give rise to a number of malignancies including: follicular dendritic cell sarcoma; fibroblastic reticular cell sarcoma; inflammatory myofibroblastic tumours and others.

In addition, lymph node stromal cells may produce growth factors which actively contribute to tumour cell metastasis.
