= Stroma (tissue) =

Part of a tissue or organ with a structural or connective role

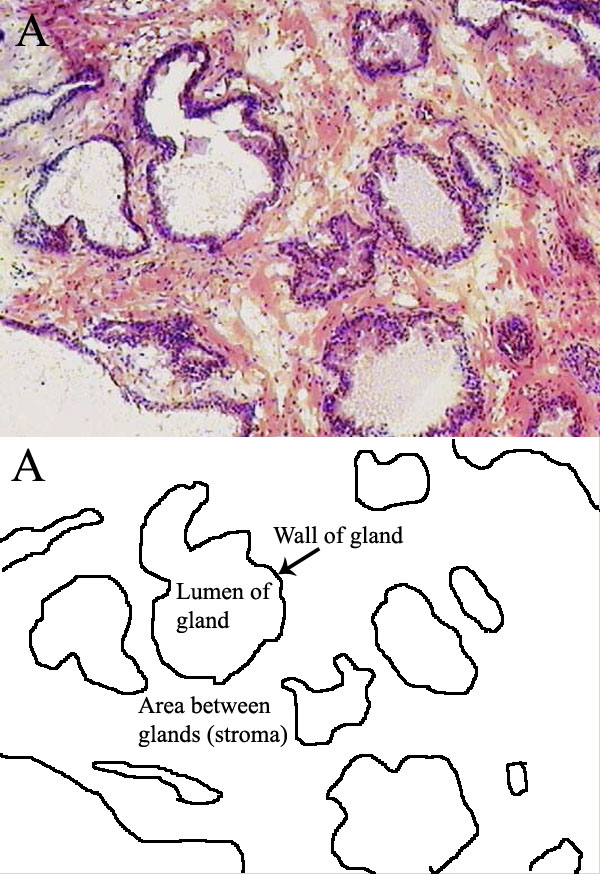
- Prostate under an optical microscope. This micrograph shows the microscopic glands of the prostate.

Details
- Part of: Connective tissue

Identifiers
- Latin: stroma
- TH: H2.00.00.0.00003
- FMA: 81494 81494, 81494

Stroma (from Ancient Greek στρῶμα (strôma) 'layer, bed, bed covering') is the part of a tissue or organ with a structural or connective role. It is made up of all the parts without specific functions of the organ - for example, connective tissue, blood vessels, ducts, etc. The other part, the parenchyma, consists of the cells that perform the function of the tissue or organ.

There are multiple ways of classifying tissues: one classification scheme is based on tissue functions and another analyzes their cellular components. Stromal tissue falls into the "functional" class that contributes to the body's support and movement. The cells which make up stroma tissues serve as a matrix in which the other cells are embedded. Stroma is made of various types of stromal cells.

Examples of stroma include:

- stroma of iris
- stroma of cornea
- stroma of ovary
- stroma of thyroid gland
- stroma of thymus
- stroma of bone marrow
- lymph node stromal cell
- multipotent stromal cell (mesenchymal stem cell)

== Structure ==
Stromal connective tissues are found in the stroma; this tissue belongs to the group connective tissue proper. The function of connective tissue proper is to secure the parenchymal tissue, including blood vessels and nerves of the stroma, and to construct organs and spread mechanical tension to reduce localised stress. Stromal tissue is primarily made of extracellular matrix containing connective tissue cells. Extracellular matrix is primarily composed of ground substance - a porous, hydrated gel, made mainly from proteoglycan aggregates - and connective tissue fibers. There are three types of fibers commonly found within the stroma: collagen type I, elastic, and reticular (collagen type III) fibres.

=== Cells ===
- Wandering cells - cells that migrate into the tissue from blood stream in response to a variety of stimuli; for example, immune system blood cells causing inflammatory response.
- Fixed cells - cells that are permanent inhabitants of the tissue.
- Fibroblast - produce and secrete the organic parts of the ground substance and extracellular fibers of the matrix.

=== Types ===
1. Loose connective tissue - This type is mainly located under the epithelial membranes and glandular epithelium, attaching the epithelia to other tissues. It supports the blood vessels and nerves supplied to the epithelia. Additionally, it serves as the main site of inflammatory response within the body.
2. Dense irregular connective tissue - the function of this type is binding at a high tensile strength between tissues to convert tension from one point.
