= Allodynia =

Pain from stimuli which do not normally elicit pain

- Specialty: Pain medicine, neurology

Allodynia is a condition in which pain is caused by a stimulus that does not normally elicit pain. For example, sunburn can cause temporary allodynia, so that usually painless stimuli, such as wearing clothing or running cold or warm water over it, can be very painful. It is different from hyperalgesia, an exaggerated response from a normally painful stimulus. The term comes from Ancient Greek άλλος (állos) 'other' and οδύνη (odúnē) 'pain'.

== Types ==
There are different kinds or types of allodynia:

- Mechanical allodynia (also known as tactile allodynia)
  - Static mechanical allodynia – pain in response when touched
  - Dynamic mechanical allodynia – pain in response to stroking lightly
- Thermal (hot or cold) allodynia – pain from normally mild skin temperatures in the affected area
- Movement allodynia – pain triggered by normal movement of joints or muscles

== Causes ==
Allodynia is a clinical feature of many painful conditions, such as

- complex regional pain syndrome
- fibromyalgia
- migraine
- neuropathies
- postherpetic neuralgia.

Allodynia may also be caused by some populations of stem cells used to treat nerve damage including spinal cord injury.

== Pathophysiology ==
=== Cellular level ===
Mechanoreceptors can influence the output of nociceptors by making connections with the same interneurons, the activation of which can reduce or eliminate the sensation of pain. Another way to modulate the transmission of pain information is via descending fibers from the brain. These fibers act through different interneurons to block the transmission of information from the nociceptors to secondary neurons.

Both of these mechanisms for pain modulation have been implicated in the pathology of allodynia. Several studies suggest that injury to the spinal cord might lead to loss and re-organization of the nociceptors, mechanoreceptors, and interneurons, leading to the transmission of pain information by mechanoreceptors. A different study reported the appearance of descending fibers at the injury site. All of these changes ultimately affect the circuitry inside the spinal cord, and the altered balance of signals probably leads to the intense sensation of pain associated with allodynia.

Different cell types have also been linked to allodynia. For example, there are reports that microglia in the thalamus might contribute to allodynia by changing the properties of the secondary nociceptors. The same effect is achieved in the spinal cord by the recruitment of immune system cells such as monocytes/macrophages and T lymphocytes.

=== Molecular level ===
There is a substantial body of evidence that the so-called sensitization of the central nervous system contributes to the emergence of allodynia. Sensitization refers to the increased response of neurons following repetitive stimulation. In addition to repeated activity, the increased levels of certain compounds lead to sensitization. The work of many researchers has led to the elucidation of pathways that can result in neuronal sensitization both in the thalamus and dorsal horns. Both pathways depend on the production of chemokines and other molecules important in the inflammatory response.

An important molecule in the thalamus appears to be cysteine-cysteine chemokine ligand 21 (CCL21). The concentration of this chemokine is increased in the ventral posterolateral nucleus of the thalamus, where secondary nociceptive neurons make connections with other neurons. The source of CCL21 is not exactly known, but two possibilities exist. First, it might be made in primary nociceptive neurons and transported to the thalamus. Most likely, neurons intrinsic to the ventral posterolateral nucleus make at least some of it. In any case, CCL21 binds to C-C chemokine receptor type 7 and chemokine receptor CXCR3 receptors on microglia in the thalamus. The physiologic response to the binding is probably the production of prostaglandin E_{2} (PGE_{2}) by cyclooxygenase 2 (COX-2). Activated microglia making PGE_{2} can then sensitize nociceptive neurons as manifested by their lowered threshold to pain.

The mechanism responsible for sensitization of the central nervous system at the spinal cord level differs from that in the thalamus. Tumor necrosis factor (TNF) and its receptor are the molecules that seem to be responsible for the sensitization of neurons in the dorsal horns of the spinal cord. Macrophages and lymphocytes infiltrate the spinal cord, for example, because of injury, and release TNF and other pro-inflammatory molecules. TNF then binds to the TNF receptors expressed on nociceptors, activating the MAPK/NF-kappa B pathways. This leads to the production of more TNF, its release, and binding to the receptors on the cells that released it (autocrine signalling). This mechanism also explains the perpetuation of sensitization and, thus, allodynia. TNF might also increase the number of AMPA receptors and decrease the numbers of GABA receptors on the membrane of nociceptors, both of which could change the nociceptors in a way that allows for their easier activation. Another outcome of the increased TNF is the release of PGE_{2}, with a mechanism and effect similar to the ones in the thalamus.

== Treatment ==
=== Medications ===
Numerous compounds alleviate the pain from allodynia. Some are specific for certain types of allodynia while others are general. They include:

Dynamic mechanical allodynia – compounds targeting different ion channels; opioids

- Mexiletine
- Lidocaine (IV/topical)
- Tramadol
- Morphine (IV)
- Alfentanil (IV)
- Ketamine (IV)
- Methylprednisone (intrathecal)
- Adenosine
- Glycine antagonist
- Desipramine
- Venlafaxine
- Pregabalin

Static mechanical allodynia – sodium channel blockers, opioids

- Lidocaine (IV)
- Alfentanil (IV)
- Adenosine (IV)
- Ketamine (IV)
- Glycine antagonist
- Venlafaxine
- Gabapentin (may also be helpful in cold and dynamic allodynias)

Cold allodynia

- Lamotrigine
- Lidocaine (IV)

The list of compounds that can be used to treat allodynia is even longer than this. For example, many non-steroidal anti-inflammatory drugs, such as naproxen, can inhibit COX-1 and/or COX-2, thus preventing the sensitization of the central nervous system. Another effect of naproxen is the reduction of the responsiveness of mechano- and thermoreceptors to stimuli.

Other compounds act on molecules important for the transmission of an action potential from one neuron to another. Examples of these include interfering with receptors for neurotransmitters or the enzymes that remove neurotransmitters not bound to receptors.

Endocannabinoids are molecules that can relieve pain by modulating nociceptive neurons. When anandamide, an endocannabinoid, is released, pain sensation is reduced. Anandamide is later transported back to the neurons releasing it using transporter enzymes on the plasma membrane, eventually disinhibiting pain perception. However, this re-uptake can be blocked by AM404, elongating the duration of pain inhibition.

== Notable people ==
- Howard Hughes is thought to have had allodynia in his later years; he seldom bathed, wore clothes, or cut his nails and hair, possibly due to the pain these typically normal actions would cause him.

== See also ==
- Hyperalgesia
