= CCL21 =

Mammalian protein found in humans

Identifiers
- Aliases: CCL21, 6Ckine, CKb9, ECL, SCYA21, SLC, TCA4, C-C motif chemokine ligand 21
- External IDs: OMIM: 602737; MGI: 1349183; GeneCards: CCL21
Available structures
PDB	Ortholog search: PDBe RCSB
PDB	List of PDB id codes 2L4N

Gene location (Human)
Chr.	Chromosome 9 (human)
Band	9p13.3	Start	34,709,005 bp
Band	9p13.3	End	34,710,136 bp

Gene location (Mouse)
Chr.	Chromosome 4 (mouse)
Band	4 A5|4 22.81 cM	Start	42,772,860 bp
Band	4 A5|4 22.81 cM	End	42,773,993 bp
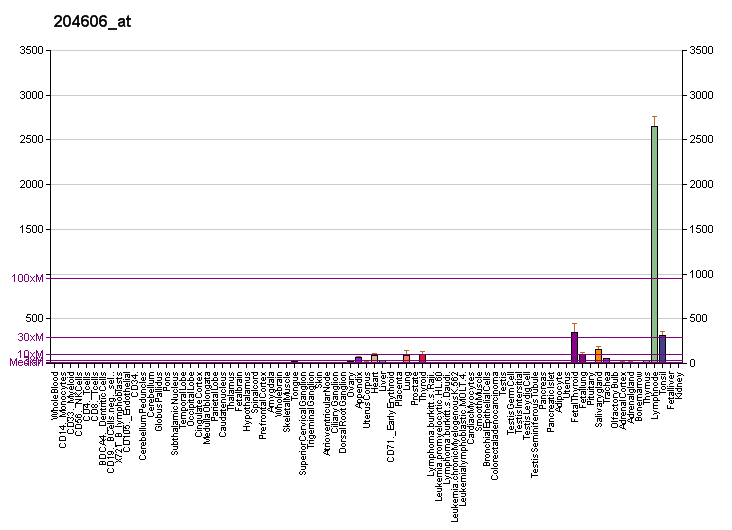
RNA expression pattern
Bgee	Human / Mouse (ortholog); Top expressed in: lymph node; right lobe of thyroid gland; appendix; left lobe of thyroid gland; rectum; gallbladder; gastric mucosa; mucosa of transverse colon; right uterine tube; upper lobe of left lung / Top expressed in: thymus; spleen; urinary bladder; lip; ovary; lung; esophagus; uterus; colon; ileum; More reference expression data
BioGPS	More reference expression data
Gene ontology
Molecular function	cytokine activity; chemokine receptor binding; CCR7 chemokine receptor binding; chemokine activity; CCR chemokine receptor binding; protein binding
Cellular component	extracellular region; extracellular space
Biological process	negative regulation of leukocyte tethering or rolling; release of sequestered calcium ion into cytosol; positive regulation of receptor-mediated endocytosis; positive regulation of protein kinase B signaling; positive regulation of cell motility; positive regulation of actin filament polymerization; monocyte chemotaxis; activation of GTPase activity; ruffle organization; positive regulation of cell-matrix adhesion; chemokine-mediated signaling pathway; cellular response to tumor necrosis factor; cell-cell signaling; T cell costimulation; cell maturation; positive regulation of JNK cascade; dendritic cell chemotaxis; negative regulation of dendritic cell dendrite assembly; positive regulation of phosphatidylinositol 3-kinase activity; chemotaxis; response to prostaglandin E; positive regulation of dendritic cell antigen processing and presentation; dendritic cell dendrite assembly; positive regulation of pseudopodium assembly; mesangial cell-matrix adhesion; positive regulation of chemotaxis; cellular response to interleukin-1; immune response; establishment of T cell polarity; positive regulation of ERK1 and ERK2 cascade; positive regulation of glycoprotein biosynthetic process; cellular response to interferon-gamma; positive regulation of I-kappaB kinase/NF-kappaB signaling; cell chemotaxis; lymphocyte chemotaxis; positive regulation of neutrophil chemotaxis; positive regulation of cell adhesion mediated by integrin; immunological synapse formation; positive regulation of filopodium assembly; positive regulation of T cell migration; positive regulation of myeloid dendritic cell chemotaxis; positive regulation of protein kinase activity; inflammatory response; antimicrobial humoral immune response mediated by antimicrobial peptide; regulation of signaling receptor activity; G protein-coupled receptor signaling pathway; negative regulation of dendritic cell apoptotic process; positive regulation of T cell chemotaxis; neutrophil chemotaxis; chemokine (C-C motif) ligand 21 signaling pathway; positive regulation of GTPase activity; cellular response to chemokine
Sources:Amigo / QuickGO
Orthologs
Databases	NCBI: entry; OMA: entry
Species	Human	Mouse
Entrez	6366	18829
Ensembl	ENSG00000137077	ENSMUSG00000094686
UniProt	O00585	P84444
RefSeq (mRNA)	NM_002989	NM_011124
RefSeq (protein)	NP_002980	NP_035254
Location (UCSC)	Chr 9: 34.71 – 34.71 Mb	Chr 4: 42.77 – 42.77 Mb
PubMed search
- Wikidata
View/Edit Human	View/Edit Mouse

Chemokine (C-C motif) ligand 21 (CCL21) is a small cytokine belonging to the CC chemokine family. This chemokine is also known as 6Ckine (because it has six conserved cysteine residues instead of the four cysteines typical to chemokines), exodus-2, and secondary lymphoid-tissue chemokine (SLC). CCL21 elicits its effects by binding to a cell surface chemokine receptor known as CCR7. The main function of CCL21 is to guide CCR7 expressing leukocytes to the secondary lymphoid organs, such as lymph nodes and Peyer's patches.

== Gene ==
The gene for CCL21 is located on human chromosome 9. CCL21 is classified as a homeostatic chemokine, it is produced constitutively. However, its expression increases during inflammation.

== Protein structure ==
Chemokine CCL21 contains an extended C-terminus which is not found in CCL19, another ligand of CCR7. C-terminal tail is composed of 37 amino acids rich in positively charged residues and therefore, it has high affinity for negatively charged molecules of the extracellular matrix. The cleavage of the C-terminal tail by peptidases produces a soluble form of CCL21. The soluble CCL21 occurs also in physiological conditions. It does not bind to extracellular matrix and therefore, its function differs from the function of the full-length CCL21.

== Function ==
=== Migration to secondary lymphoid organs ===
Naïve T cells circulate through secondary lymphoid organs until they encounter the antigen. CCL21 is a chemokine involved in the recruitment of T cells into secondary lymphoid organs. It is produced by lymphatic endothelial cells and lymph node stromal cells. Full-length CCL21 is bound to glycosaminoglycans, and endothelial cells and it induces the chemotactic migration of T cells and the cell adhesion caused by integrin activation. In contrast, the soluble CCL21 is not involved in the induction of the cell adhesion. After T cells enter the lymph nodes through high endothelial venules, they are attracted to the T cell zone, where fibroblastic reticular cells are the abundant source of CCL21.

CCL21/CCR7 interaction also plays a role in the migration of dendritic cells to the secondary lymphoid organs. Dendritic cells upregulate the expression of CCR7 during their maturation. CCL21 is bound to the lymphatic vessels and attracts CCR7 expressing dendritic cells from peripheral tissues. Then they migrate along the chemokine gradient to the lymph node where they present the antigen to T cells. Interactions between dendritic cells and T cells are necessary for the initiation of the adaptive immune response. When CCL21 is not recognized by the cells (for example in CCR7-deficient mice), a delayed and reduced adaptive immune response occurs due to reduced interactions between dendritic cells and T cells in the lymph nodes. Semi-mature dendritic cells express CCR7 in the absence of a danger signal. They use CCL21 chemokine gradient for the migration to the lymph nodes even when there is no inflammation in the body, and they contribute to peripheral tolerance.

Other cells using chemokine CCL21 for the migration to the lymph nodes are B cells. However, they are less dependent on it in comparison to T cells.

=== T cell development in the thymus ===
CCL21/CCR7 interaction plays a role in the T cell development in the thymus. CCL21 is produced in the thymus medulla by medullary thymic epithelial cells, and it attracts single positive thymocytes from the thymus cortex to the medulla, where they undergo negative selection to delete autoreactive thymocytes.
