= Reticulin stain =

Staining method in histology

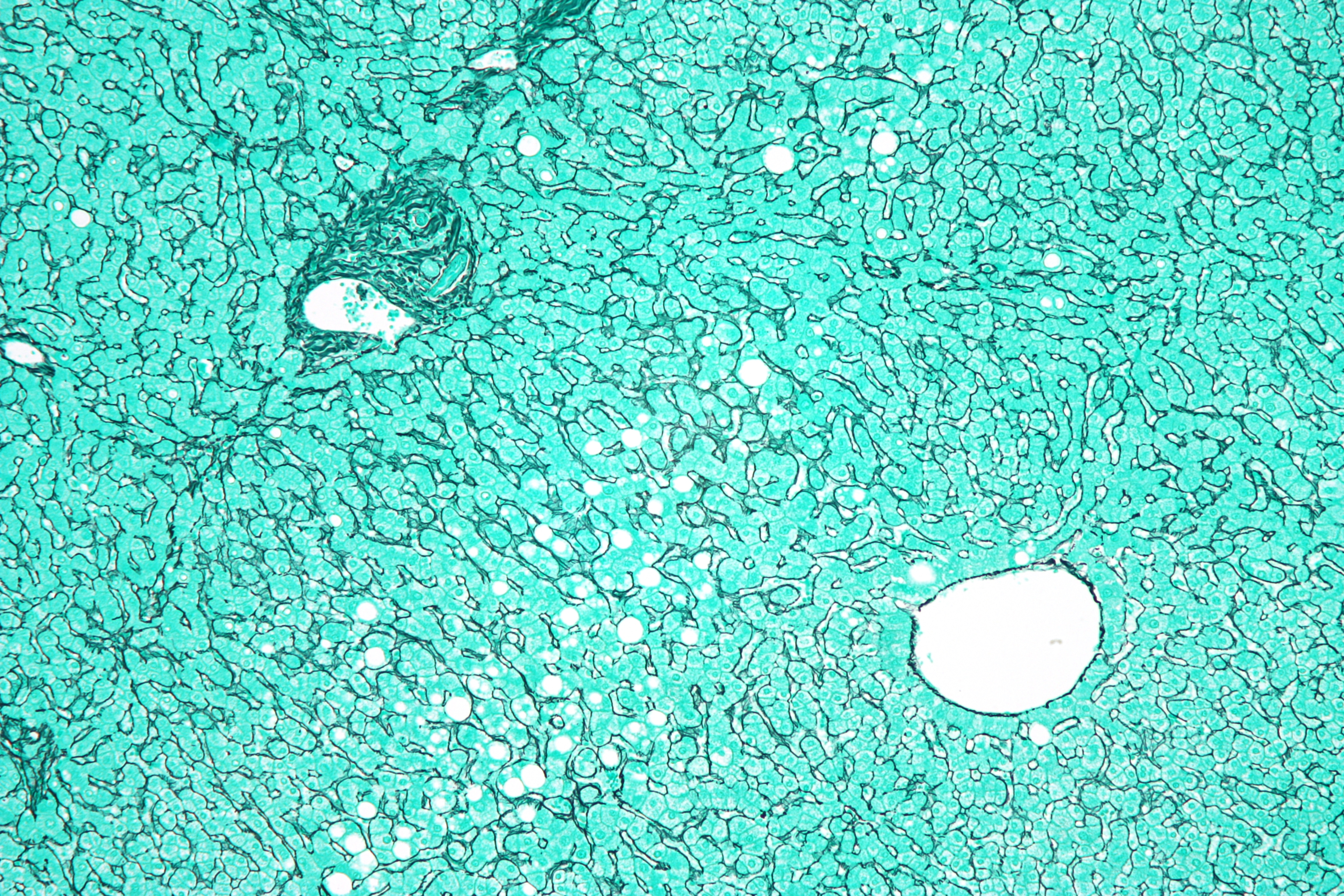
A liver biopsy stained using the reticulin demonstrating the normal hepatic plate thickness and mild steatosis

In pathology, the reticulin stain is a popular staining method in histology. It is used to visualize reticular fiber and used extensively in liver histopathology.

== See also ==
- H&E stain
- Trichrome stain
