= Reticular cell =

Connective tissue cell which produces reticular fibers

Details
- Function: Collagen synthesis

Identifiers
- Latin: cellula reticularis~cells
- MeSH: D012155
- TH: H2.00.03.0.01004
- FMA: 62877

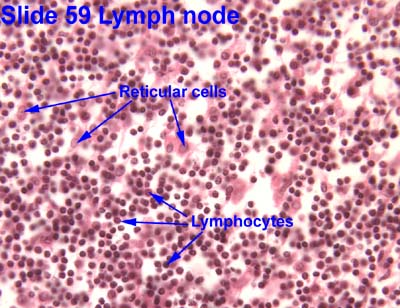
Reticular cells as seen in Liver.

In cellular biology, a reticular cell is a type of fibroblast that synthesizes collagen alpha-1(III) and uses it to produce extracellular reticular fibers. Reticular cells provide structural support, since they produce and maintain the thin networks of fibers that are a framework for most lymphoid organs.

Reticular cells are found in many organs, including the spleen, lymph nodes and kidneys. They are also found within tissues, such as lymph nodules. There are different types of reticular cells, including epithelial, mesenchymal, and fibroblastic reticular cells. Fibroblastic reticular cells are involved in directing B cells and T cells to specific regions within the tissue whereas epithelial and mesenchymal reticular cells are associated with certain areas of the brain.

== See also ==
- List of human cell types derived from the germ layers
- Lymph node stromal cell#Fibroblastic reticular cells (FRC)
