= PRSS16 =

Protein-coding gene in the species Homo sapiens

Identifiers
- Aliases: PRSS16, TSSP, protease, serine 16, serine protease 16
- External IDs: OMIM: 607169; MGI: 1859181; GeneCards: PRSS16

Gene location (Human)
Chr.	Chromosome 6 (human)
Band	6p22.1	Start	27,247,701 bp
Band	6p22.1	End	27,256,624 bp

Gene location (Mouse)
Chr.	Chromosome 13 (mouse)
Band	13 A3.1|13 8.12 cM	Start	22,186,343 bp
Band	13 A3.1|13 8.12 cM	End	22,193,912 bp
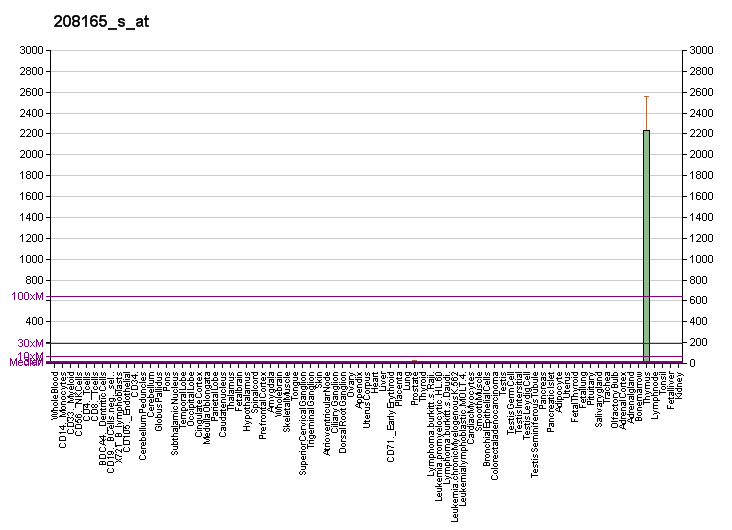
RNA expression pattern
Bgee	Human / Mouse (ortholog); Top expressed in: thymus; body of pancreas; mucosa of transverse colon; rectum; right lobe of thyroid gland; left lobe of thyroid gland; right uterine tube; palpebral conjunctiva; duodenum; minor salivary glands / Top expressed in: thymus; stroma of bone marrow; granulocyte; yolk sac; morula; embryo; embryo; blastocyst; endothelial cell of lymphatic vessel; tibiofemoral joint; More reference expression data
BioGPS	More reference expression data
Gene ontology
Molecular function	peptidase activity; serine-type peptidase activity; hydrolase activity; dipeptidyl-peptidase activity
Cellular component	endosome; lysosome; cytoplasmic vesicle
Biological process	protein catabolic process; proteolysis
Sources:Amigo / QuickGO
Orthologs
Databases	NCBI: entry; OMA: entry
Species	Human	Mouse
Entrez	10279	54373
Ensembl	ENSG00000112812	ENSMUSG00000006179
UniProt	Q9NQE7	Q9QXE5
RefSeq (mRNA)	NM_005865	NM_019429
RefSeq (protein)	NP_005856	NP_062302
Location (UCSC)	Chr 6: 27.25 – 27.26 Mb	Chr 13: 22.19 – 22.19 Mb
PubMed search
- Wikidata
View/Edit Human	View/Edit Mouse

Thymus-specific serine protease is an enzyme that in humans is encoded by the PRSS16 gene.

This gene encodes a serine protease expressed exclusively in the thymus. It is thought to play a role in the alternative antigen presenting pathway used by cortical thymic epithelial cells during the positive selection of T cells.

The gene is found in the large histone gene cluster on chromosome 6, near the major histocompatibility complex (MHC) class I region. A second transcript variant has been described, but its full length nature has not been determined.
