= CCL19 =

Mammalian protein found in humans

Identifiers
- Aliases: CCL19, CKb11, ELC, MIP-3b, MIP3B, SCYA19, C-C motif chemokine ligand 19
- External IDs: OMIM: 602227; MGI: 5434459; GeneCards: CCL19
Available structures
PDB	Human UniProt search: PDBe RCSB
PDB	List of PDB id codes 2MP1

Gene location (Human)
Chr.	Chromosome 9 (human)
Band	9p13.3	Start	34,689,570 bp
Band	9p13.3	End	34,691,276 bp

Gene location (Mouse)
Chr.	Chromosome 4 (mouse)
Band	4 A5|4	Start	42,070,757 bp
Band	4 A5|4	End	42,072,779 bp
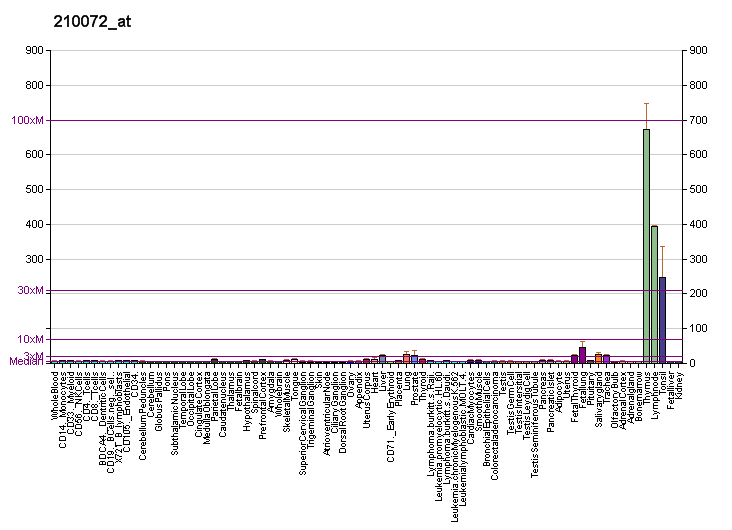
RNA expression pattern
Bgee	Human / Mouse (ortholog); Top expressed in: appendix; lymph node; gallbladder; thymus; rectum; mucosa of transverse colon; mucosa of ileum; left coronary artery; olfactory zone of nasal mucosa; epithelium of nasopharynx / Top expressed in: spleen; adrenal gland; muscle of thigh; superior frontal gyrus; thymus; primary visual cortex; dentate gyrus of hippocampal formation granule cell; lip; zone of skin; right kidney; More reference expression data
BioGPS	More reference expression data
Gene ontology
Molecular function	CCR10 chemokine receptor binding; cytokine activity; chemokine receptor binding; CCR7 chemokine receptor binding; chemokine activity; CCR chemokine receptor binding; protein binding
Cellular component	extracellular region; intracellular anatomical structure; extracellular space
Biological process	release of sequestered calcium ion into cytosol; positive regulation of receptor-mediated endocytosis; positive regulation of protein kinase B signaling; positive regulation of cell motility; positive regulation of dendritic cell dendrite assembly; positive regulation of interleukin-12 production; regulation of cell projection assembly; monocyte chemotaxis; positive regulation of T-helper 1 cell differentiation; chemokine-mediated signaling pathway; response to nitric oxide; cellular response to tumor necrosis factor; T cell costimulation; response to virus; cellular calcium ion homeostasis; cell maturation; myeloid dendritic cell chemotaxis; positive regulation of JNK cascade; dendritic cell chemotaxis; positive regulation of phosphatidylinositol 3-kinase activity; chemotaxis; cell communication; positive regulation of endocytosis; positive regulation of GTPase activity; response to prostaglandin E; positive regulation of dendritic cell antigen processing and presentation; positive regulation of chemotaxis; cellular response to interleukin-1; positive regulation of T cell proliferation; immune response; positive regulation of ERK1 and ERK2 cascade; establishment of T cell polarity; positive regulation of glycoprotein biosynthetic process; cellular response to interferon-gamma; positive regulation of tumor necrosis factor production; positive regulation of I-kappaB kinase/NF-kappaB signaling; lymphocyte chemotaxis; positive regulation of neutrophil chemotaxis; inflammatory response; immunological synapse formation; mature conventional dendritic cell differentiation; positive regulation of protein kinase activity; antimicrobial humoral immune response mediated by antimicrobial peptide; regulation of signaling receptor activity; G protein-coupled receptor signaling pathway; negative regulation of dendritic cell apoptotic process; cytokine-mediated signaling pathway; positive regulation of NIK/NF-kappaB signaling; neutrophil chemotaxis
Sources:Amigo / QuickGO
Orthologs
Databases	NCBI: entry; OMA: entry
Species	Human	Mouse
Entrez	6363	100861647
Ensembl	ENSG00000172724	ENSMUSG00000118633
UniProt	Q99731	n/a
RefSeq (mRNA)	NM_006274	XM_006538413
RefSeq (protein)	NP_006265	n/a
Location (UCSC)	Chr 9: 34.69 – 34.69 Mb	Chr 4: 42.07 – 42.07 Mb
PubMed search
- Wikidata
View/Edit Human	View/Edit Mouse

Chemokine (C-C motif) ligand 19 (CCL19) is a protein that in humans is encoded by the CCL19 gene.

This gene is one of several CC cytokine genes clustered on the p-arm of chromosome 9. Cytokines are a family of secreted proteins involved in immunoregulatory and inflammatory processes. The CC cytokines are proteins characterized by two adjacent cysteines. The cytokine encoded by this gene may play a role in normal lymphocyte recirculation and homing. It also plays an important role in trafficking of T cells in thymus, and in T cell and B cell migration to secondary lymphoid organs. It specifically binds to chemokine receptor CCR7.

Chemokine (C-C motif) ligand 19 (CCL19) is a small cytokine belonging to the CC chemokine family that is also known as EBI1 ligand chemokine (ELC) and macrophage inflammatory protein-3-beta (MIP-3-beta). CCL19 is expressed abundantly in thymus and lymph nodes, with moderate levels in trachea and colon and low levels in stomach, small intestine, lung, kidney and spleen. The gene for CCL19 is located on human chromosome 9. This chemokine elicits its effects on its target cells by binding to the chemokine receptor chemokine receptor CCR7. It attracts certain cells of the immune system, including dendritic cells and antigen-engaged B cells, CCR7+ central-memory T-Cells.
