= Wandering cell =

In anatomy and histology, the term wandering cell (or ameboid cell) is used to describe cells that are found in connective tissue, but are not fixed in place. This term is used occasionally and usually refers to blood leukocytes (which are not fixed and organized in solid tissue) in particular mononuclear phagocytes. Frequently, the term refers to circulating macrophages and has been used also for stationary macrophages fixed in tissues (histiocytes), which are sometimes referred to as "resting wandering cells".

== Connective tissue cells ==
Connective tissue cells are typically divided into two types, fixed cells and wandering cells. Fibrocytes, or fibroblasts and fat cells(adipocytes) are fixed cells, where as macrophages, monocytes, lymphocytes, plasma cells, eosinophils and mast cells are wandering cells. Fibrocytes are the most common cell type in connective tissues. If fibrocytes are stimulated by damage to the surrounding tissue, the fibrocyte is altered into a fibroblast. The fibroblasts contain organelles that are necessary for the synthesis and excretion of proteins needed to repair the tissue damage. Fibrocytes usually do not leave the connective tissue. Reticular cells are usually larger than fibrocytes. Reticular cells are the fibrocytes of reticular connective tissue and form a network of reticular fibers. Adipocytes are fat cells that are fixed cells in loose connective tissue. Their main function is the storage of lipid. Macrophages arise from monocytes. Monocytes originate in the bone marrow upon which they are released into the blood stream. They are mobile and leave the blood stream to enter connective tissues where they differentiate into macrophages. The fibroblasts are the most important in the connective tissue. Fibroblasts manufacture and maintain the extracellular material. They migrate throughout the extracellular matrix to wherever they are needed. Adipocytes are cells that are very efficient at storing energy in the form of triglycerides.

== Types of cells ==
Macrophages: Supported by a network of connective tissue. Understood as the Reticuloendothelial System, the RES allows microglial differential in the CNS, pulmonary alveolar macrophages, tissue histiocytes, Kupffler Hepatic macrophages, Glomerular Mesangial Proliferation and unnamed Splenic expression of wandering macrophages. Sharing of iron storage remains an essential mystery.

Lymphocytes: These are cells responsible for immune responses that circulate in the blood. Normally, only small numbers are found in the CTs throughout the body. The number increases dramatically at certain sites of tissue inflammation. They are also very numerous in the lamina propria of the respiratory and gastrointestinal tracts, where they are involved in immunosurveillance. The lamina propria is a layer of loose CT lying immediately beneath the epithelium.

Plasma cells: Plasma cells are derived from B-lymphocytes and produce antibodies against a specific antigen. They have a limited migratory ability and a short life.

Neutrophils: Neutrophils are white blood cells that act as phagocytes in the early stages of acute inflammation.

Eosinophils: Eosinophils are white blood cells that are found in the lamina propria of the GI tract, and at sites of allergic reaction and parasitic infection.

Basophils: Basophils are white blood cells that are similar to mast cells in having vasoactive agents released in response to an allergen.

Monocytes: Monocytes are white blood cells that will give rise to all the phagocytes of the mononuclear phagocytic system (see Ross et al., pg. 110, and Table 5.4, pg. 112). In CT, they give rise to macrophages (histiocytes).

== Characteristics ==
Wandering Cells are probably amoeboid when alive but after fixations they are seen to possess a distinct nucleus. These cells are regarded as a special type of blood cell. The cells were found to take up iron saccharate, which had been injected into the hemocoele. The cell's cytoplasm contains a variety of inclusions and characteristically, a well-marked eosinophilic area. The wandering cells of nudibranchs are excretory taking up effete matter from the hemocoele and discharging it into the lumen of the gut.

== Lymphocytes ==
Lymphocytes are just one group of cells that function as part of the immune system. More of this group travel around the lymphatic system than in the blood network. Two types of lymphocytes are present in the bloodstream, which are the B cells and the T cells.

B cells are wandering cells that are antibody factories. They are capable of producing molecules that can recognize and bond to specific types of molecules present in infectious organisms or substances that the body identifies as foreign. Every individual B cell makes only one particular type of antibody, specific to only one type of foreign substance. For example, where one cell produces antibody against one of the many viral causes of a cold, another cell's antibodies will ignore the presence of the same virus completely. Normally, the body contains many different B cells, specialized for a specific invader, but only has low levels of each type circulating. When an invader manages to break past other defenses, like the skin or digestive tract into the body, then the circulating B cells that target that particular foreigner multiply up and produce more antibody. Special forms of B cell called plasma cells produce antibodies; little versions of the specialized B cells, called memory B cells, remain stored in lymph glands prepared for the next invasion by the foreigner. Although the products of B cells, the antibodies, stick onto their target invader, they most often do not kill the invader. This job falls to other types of lymphocytes called T cells. There are three different forms of T cells, which are the Helper T cells, the Killer T cells, and the Suppressor T cells.

== See also ==
- Amoeboid
