= C-C chemokine receptor type 7 =

Protein-coding gene in the species Homo sapiens

CCR7
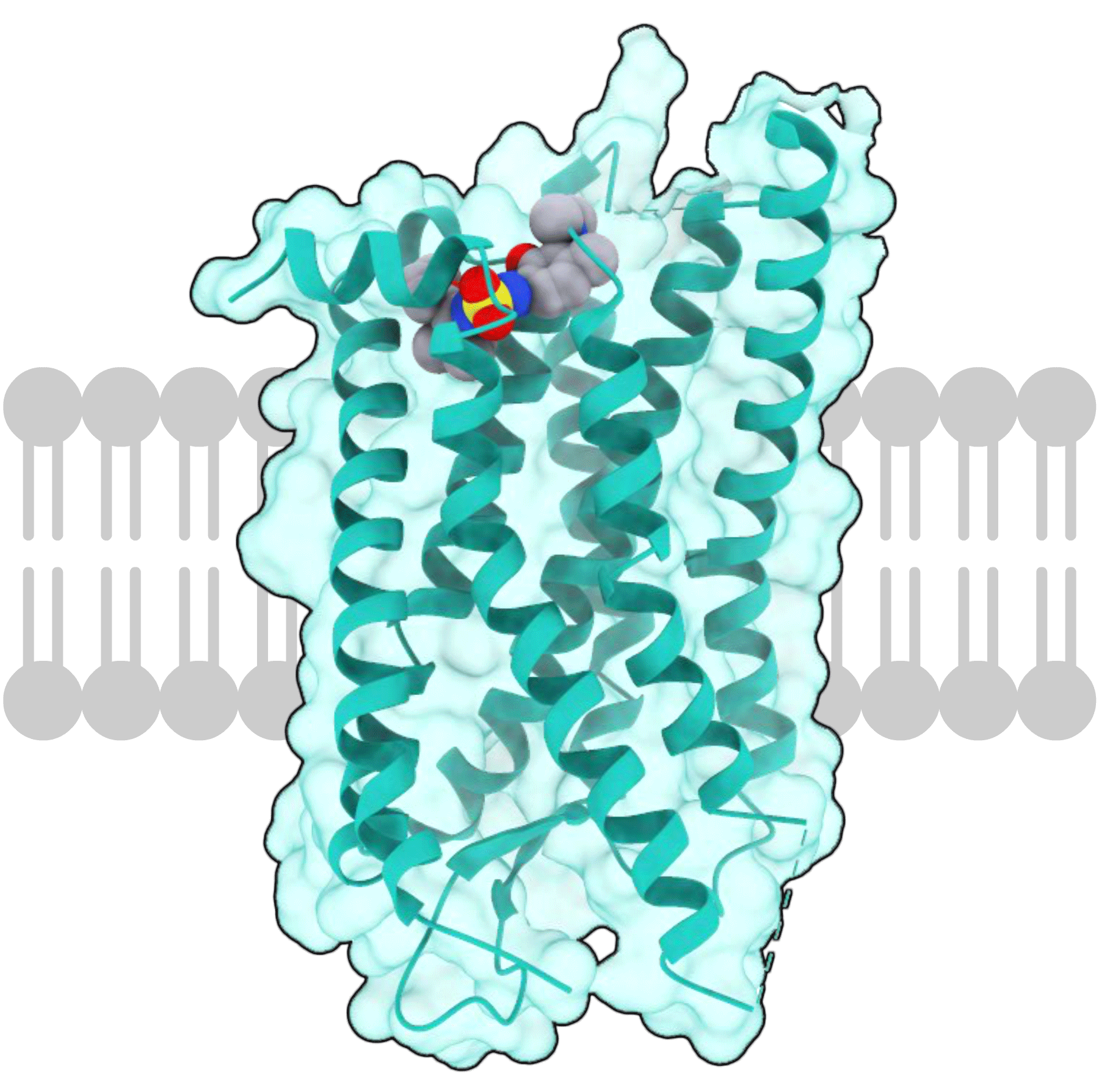

Identifiers
- Aliases: CCR7, BLR2, CC-CKR-7, CCR-7, CD197, CDw197, CMKBR7, EBI1, C-C motif chemokine receptor 7
- External IDs: OMIM: 600242; MGI: 103011; GeneCards: CCR7

Gene location (Human)
Chr.	Chromosome 17 (human)
Band	17q21.2	Start	40,553,769 bp
Band	17q21.2	End	40,565,472 bp

Gene location (Mouse)
Chr.	Chromosome 11 (mouse)
Band	11|11 D	Start	99,035,022 bp
Band	11|11 D	End	99,045,903 bp
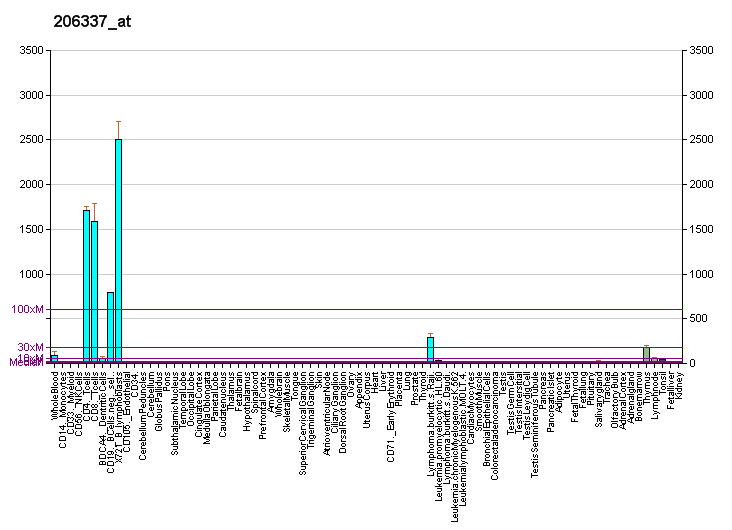
RNA expression pattern
Bgee	Human / Mouse (ortholog); Top expressed in: appendix; lymph node; blood; granulocyte; thymus; spleen; superficial temporal artery; mucosa of ileum; testicle; bone marrow / Top expressed in: mesenteric lymph nodes; blood; spleen; thymus; embryo; embryo; subcutaneous adipose tissue; granulocyte; right lung lobe; bone marrow; More reference expression data
BioGPS	More reference expression data
Gene ontology
Molecular function	C-C motif chemokine 19 receptor activity; C-C motif chemokine 21 receptor activity; G protein-coupled receptor activity; chemokine (C-C motif) ligand 19 binding; chemokine (C-C motif) ligand 21 binding; signal transducer activity; chemokine receptor activity; C-C chemokine receptor activity; chemokine binding; C-C chemokine binding
Cellular component	integral component of membrane; membrane; plasma membrane; intracellular anatomical structure; cell surface; external side of plasma membrane; mitochondrion
Biological process	G protein-coupled receptor signaling pathway; release of sequestered calcium ion into cytosol; positive regulation of protein kinase B signaling; positive regulation of cell motility; positive regulation of glycoprotein biosynthetic process involved in immunological synapse formation; positive regulation of actin filament polymerization; lymphocyte migration into lymph node; homeostasis of number of cells; positive regulation of interleukin-12 production; positive regulation of hypersensitivity; activation of GTPase activity; ruffle organization; positive regulation of cell-matrix adhesion; positive regulation of cytosolic calcium ion concentration; positive regulation of T cell receptor signaling pathway; regulation of interferon-gamma production; response to nitric oxide; regulation of dendritic cell dendrite assembly; positive regulation of JNK cascade; myeloid dendritic cell chemotaxis; dendritic cell chemotaxis; cellular response to cytokine stimulus; negative thymic T cell selection; positive regulation of phosphatidylinositol 3-kinase activity; chemotaxis; positive regulation of immunological synapse formation; response to prostaglandin E; response to lipopolysaccharide; positive regulation of dendritic cell antigen processing and presentation; positive regulation of pseudopodium assembly; positive regulation of humoral immune response; immune response; establishment of T cell polarity; positive regulation of ERK1 and ERK2 cascade; positive regulation of neutrophil chemotaxis; positive regulation of I-kappaB kinase/NF-kappaB signaling; positive regulation of T cell costimulation; inflammatory response; mature conventional dendritic cell differentiation; positive regulation of filopodium assembly; positive regulation of dendritic cell chemotaxis; signal transduction; positive regulation of cell adhesion; positive regulation of protein kinase activity; chemokine-mediated signaling pathway; chemokine (C-C motif) ligand 19 signaling pathway; chemokine (C-C motif) ligand 21 signaling pathway; negative regulation of dendritic cell apoptotic process; calcium-mediated signaling; cell chemotaxis
Sources:Amigo / QuickGO
Orthologs
Databases	NCBI: entry; OMA: entry
Species	Human	Mouse
Entrez	1236	12775
Ensembl	ENSG00000126353	ENSMUSG00000037944
UniProt	P32248	P47774
RefSeq (mRNA)	NM_001838; NM_001301714; NM_001301716; NM_001301717; NM_001301718	NM_001301713; NM_007719
RefSeq (protein)	NP_001288643; NP_001288645; NP_001288646; NP_001288647; NP_001829	NP_001288642; NP_031745
Location (UCSC)	Chr 17: 40.55 – 40.57 Mb	Chr 11: 99.04 – 99.05 Mb
PubMed search
- Wikidata
View/Edit Human	View/Edit Mouse

C-C chemokine receptor type 7 is a protein that in humans is encoded by the CCR7 gene. Two ligands have been identified for this receptor: the chemokine (C-C motif) ligand 19 (CCL19/ELC) and (C-C motif) ligand 21 (CCL21). The ligands have similar affinity for the receptor, though CCL19 has been shown to induce internalisation of CCR7 and desensitisation of the cell to CCL19/CCL21 signals. CCR7 is a transmembrane protein with seven transmembrane domains, which is coupled with heterotrimeric G proteins, which transduce the signal downstream through various signalling cascades. The main function of the receptor is to guide immune cells to immune organs (lymph nodes, thymus, spleen) by detecting specific chemokines, which these tissues secrete.

CCR7 has also recently been designated CD197 (cluster of differentiation 197).

== Function ==
The protein encoded by this gene is a member of the G protein-coupled receptor family. This receptor was identified as a gene induced by the Epstein–Barr virus (EBV), and is thought to be a mediator of EBV effects on B lymphocytes. As stated above, the receptor guides immune cells to immune organs such as lymph nodes, which is needed for the development of both resistance and tolerance, but it is also important for development of T cells in thymus. The receptor is expressed mostly on adaptive immune cell types, namely thymocytes, naive T and B cells, regulatory T cells, central memory lymphocytes, but also dendritic cells. CCR7 has been shown to stimulate dendritic cell maturation. CCR7 is also involved in homing of T cells to various secondary lymphoid organs such as lymph nodes and the spleen as well as trafficking of T cells within the spleen.

=== CCR7 in dendritic cells ===
CCR7´s function has been extensively studied in dendritic cells. Their activation in peripheral tissues induces CCR7 expression on the cell's surface, which recognize CCL19 and CCL21 produced in the Lymph node and increases dendritic cell expression of co-stimulation molecules (B7), and MHC class I or MHC class II. CCR7 signalling was also found to affect chemotaxis, actin dynamics but also survival of dendritic cells, though all of the mentioned functions are induced by different independent signalling pathways. Chemotaxis is regulated by MAPK pathway and surprisingly is independent of CCR7 signalling pathway regulating actin dynamics. Executive components of this cascade are kinases MEK1/2, ERK1/2, p38, JNK and perhaps others. The executive kinases phosphorylate transcription factors and other regulators thereby changing expression profile of the cell. Increased cellular survival upon CCR7 ligation stems from both pro-apoptotic molecules inhibition and survival promoting proteins stimulation as the receptor is known to activate the PI3K/AKT/mTOR pathway The effector molecules of this pathway are mTOR and NFkB, collectively the effect is exerted via anti-apoptotic Bcl2 proteins expression and inhibition of pro-apoptotic proteins GSK3B, FOXO1/3 and 4EBP1. CCR7 affects cellular actin dynamics via the RhoA/cofilin pathway.

=== Influence of CCR7 on central tolerance ===
CCR7 has been shown to be important for the selection process of T cells in thymus and its morphology formation. Experiments in mouse models have shown that mice lacking CCR7 had fewer thymocytes during development and more frequent autoimmune disorders. It is believed, that CCR7 takes part in homing of lymphoid progenitors to thymus, but also in thymocyte transition from thymic cortex to medulla. Once double negative thymocyte (first step of T cell development) undergoes positive selection, it becomes double positive (expressing both CD4 and CD8 coreceptors) and starts to express CCR7, which guides it to thymic medulla, where negative selection takes place. ccr7 knockout mice have leaky negative selection are prone autoimmune disorders. The mechanism is thought to be both thymus morphology disruption and insufficient T cell receptor stimulation It must however be noted that CCR7 affects not only central tolerance, but also peripheral tolerance by allowing homing of tolerogenic dendritic cells to lymph nodes.

== Clinical significance ==
CCR7 is expressed by various cancer cells, such as breast cancer, nonsmall lung cancer, gastric cancer and oesophageal cancer. In human breast cancer patients, expression of CCR7 in triple negative breast cancer increases the length of disease free survival following surgical removal. These observations were reproduced in a mouse model of breast cancer, where expression of CCR7 in PyVMT breast cancer cells prolonged survival and reduced lung metastases. Expression of CCR7, usually with VEGF family proteins, by cancer cells is linked with metastasis and generally poorer prognosis. Multiple mechanisms through which CCR7 expression changes the prognosis of cancer patients have been discovered. For instance, in a mouse model of human T-cell acute lymphoblastic leukemia, overexpression of CCR7 has been linked to leukemic cell invasion of the central nervous system, via proteins called beta 2 integrins, and reduced overall survival. As described above on the example of dendritic cells, CCR7 enhances survival of the cell and enables it to migrate following CCL19/CCL21 gradient, which leads to lymph nodes, in addition to that it has been shown that CCR7 ligation promotes EMT transition, which is cruicial for metastasis, as it allows cells to detach and migrate. Also CCR7 signalling induces VEGF-C and VEGF-D molecules, which promote lymphoneogenesis around the tumour.
