= Collagen, type III, alpha 1 =

Mammalian protein

COL3A1
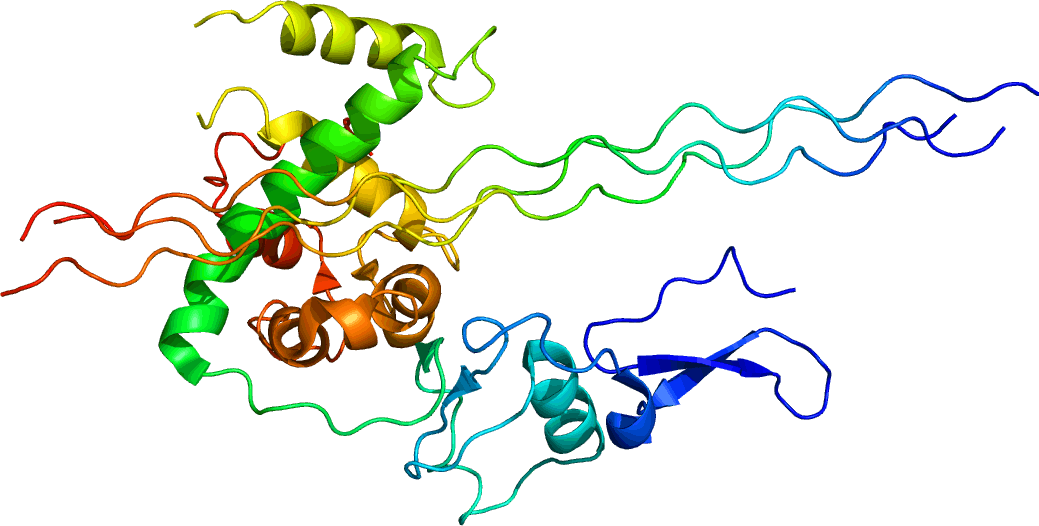

Identifiers
- Aliases: COL3A1, EDS4A, collagen type III alpha 1, collagen type III alpha 1 chain, EDSVASC, PMGEDSV
- External IDs: OMIM: 120180; MGI: 88453; GeneCards: COL3A1
Available structures
PDB	Ortholog search: PDBe RCSB
PDB	List of PDB id codes 2V53, 3DMW, 4AE2, 4AEJ, 4AK3, 4GYX

Gene location (Human)
Chr.	Chromosome 2 (human)
Band	2q32.2	Start	188,974,373 bp
Band	2q32.2	End	189,012,746 bp

Gene location (Mouse)
Chr.	Chromosome 1 (mouse)
Band	1 C1.1|1 23.67 cM	Start	45,350,698 bp
Band	1 C1.1|1 23.67 cM	End	45,388,866 bp
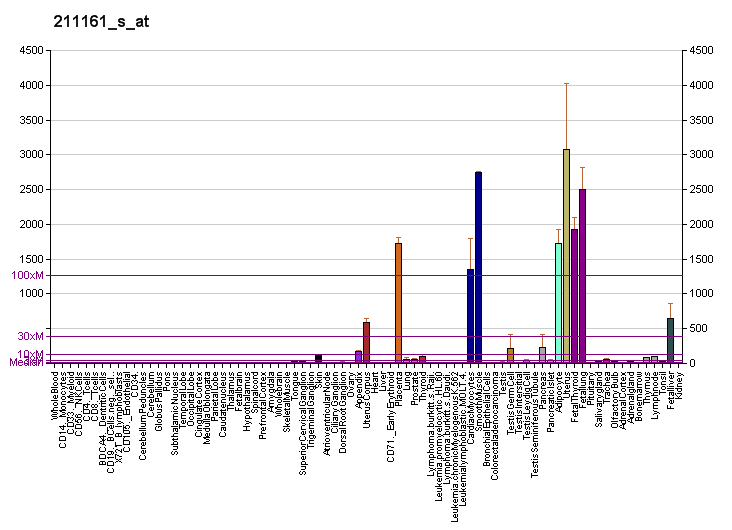

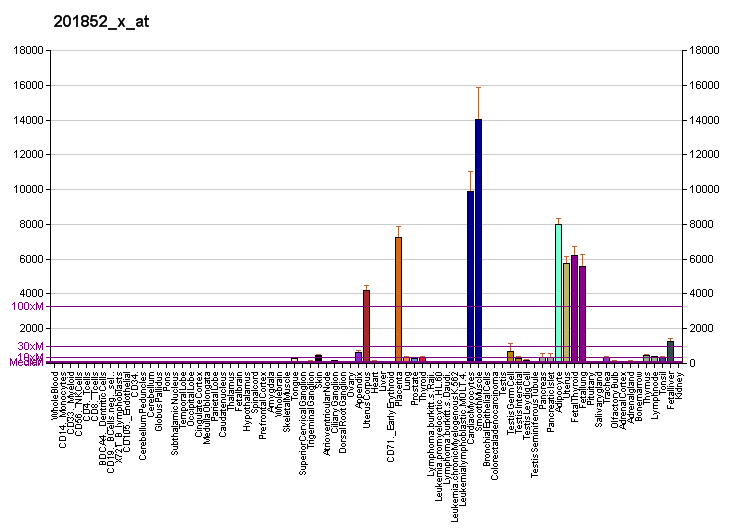

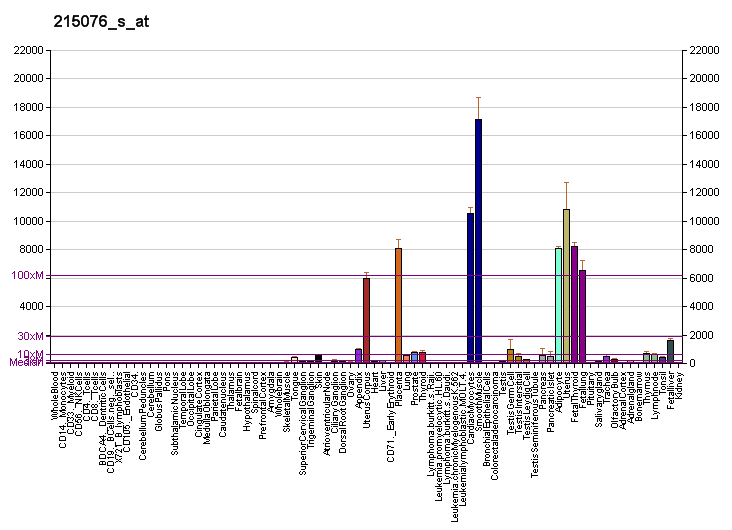
RNA expression pattern
Bgee	Human / Mouse (ortholog); Top expressed in: skin of hip; parietal pleura; visceral pleura; tendon of biceps brachii; periodontal fiber; cartilage tissue; stromal cell of endometrium; skin of thigh; skin of arm; saphenous vein / Top expressed in: efferent ductule; conjunctival fornix; vas deferens; cervix; umbilical cord; human fetus; calvaria; Gonadal ridge; ascending aorta; semi-lunar valve; More reference expression data
BioGPS	More reference expression data
Gene ontology
Molecular function	metal ion binding; integrin binding; protein binding; platelet-derived growth factor binding; SMAD binding; extracellular matrix structural constituent; protease binding; extracellular matrix structural constituent conferring tensile strength
Cellular component	collagen; endoplasmic reticulum lumen; extracellular space; collagen type III trimer; extracellular matrix; extracellular region; collagen-containing extracellular matrix
Biological process	positive regulation of Rho protein signal transduction; skeletal system development; negative regulation of neuron migration; response to cytokine; response to mechanical stimulus; ageing; extracellular matrix organization; platelet activation; development of the heart; peptide cross-linking; negative regulation of immune response; blood vessel development; regulation of immune response; cerebral cortex development; collagen catabolic process; cellular response to amino acid stimulus; integrin-mediated signaling pathway; response to radiation; cell-matrix adhesion; digestive tract development; transforming growth factor beta receptor signaling pathway; aorta smooth muscle tissue morphogenesis; skin development; collagen fibril organization; wound healing; supramolecular fiber organization
Sources:Amigo / QuickGO
Orthologs
Databases	NCBI: entry; OMA: entry
Species	Human	Mouse
Entrez	1281	12825
Ensembl	ENSG00000168542	ENSMUSG00000026043
UniProt	P02461	P08121
RefSeq (mRNA)	NM_000090; NM_001376916	NM_009930
RefSeq (protein)	NP_000081	NP_034060
Location (UCSC)	Chr 2: 188.97 – 189.01 Mb	Chr 1: 45.35 – 45.39 Mb
PubMed search
- Wikidata
View/Edit Human	View/Edit Mouse

Type III Collagen is a homotrimer, or a protein composed of three identical peptide chains (monomers), each called an alpha 1 chain of type III collagen. Formally, the monomers are called collagen type III, alpha-1 chain and in humans are encoded by the COL3A1 gene. Type III collagen is one of the fibrillar collagens whose proteins have a long, inflexible, triple-helical domain.

== Gene ==
The COL3A1 gene is located on the long (q) arm of chromosome 2 at 2q32.2, between positions 188974372 and 189012745. The gene has 51 exons and is approximately 40 kbp long. The COL3A1 gene is in tail-to-tail orientation with a gene for another fibrillar collagen, namely COL5A2.

Two transcripts are generated from the gene using different polyadenylation sites. Although alternatively spliced transcripts have been detected for this gene, they are the result of mutations; these mutations alter RNA splicing, often leading to the exclusion of an exon or use of cryptic splice sites. The resulting defective protein is the cause of a severe, rare disease, the vascular type of Ehlers-Danlos syndrome (vEDS). These studies have also provided important information about RNA splicing mechanisms in multi-exon genes.

== Tissue distribution ==
Type III collagen is found as a major structural component in hollow organs such as large blood vessels, uterus and bowel. It is also found in many other tissues together with type I collagen.

== Structure ==
Type III collagen is synthesized by cells as a pre-procollagen; the human preproα1(III) chain is 1466 amino acids long, comprising an N-terminal signal peptide (residues 1–23), an N-terminal propeptide, the roughly 1000-residue triple-helical domain, and a C-terminal propeptide.

The signal peptide is cleaved off producing a procollagen molecule. Three identical type III procollagen chains come together at the carboxy-terminal ends, and the structure is stabilized by the formation of disulphide bonds. Each individual chain folds into a left-handed helix and the three chains are then wrapped together into a right-handed superhelix, the triple helix. Prior to assembling the super-helix, each monomer is subjected to a number of post-translational modifications that occur while the monomer is being translated. First, on the order of 145 prolyl residues of the 239 in the triple-helical domain are hydroxylated to 4-hydroxyproline by prolyl-4-hydroxylase. Second, some of the lysine residues are hydroxylated or glycosylated, and some lysine as well as hydroxylysine residues undergo oxidative deamination catalysed by lysyl oxidase. Other post-translational modifications occur after the triple helix is formed. The large globular domains from both ends of the molecule are removed by C- and amino(N)-terminal-proteinases to generate triple-helical type III collagen monomers called tropocollagen. In addition, crosslinks form between certain lysine and hydroxylysine residues. In the extracellular space in tissues, type III collagen monomers assemble into macromolecular fibrils, which aggregate into fibers, providing a strong support structure for tissues requiring tensile strength.

The triple-helical conformation, which is a characteristic feature of all fibrillar collagens, is possible because of the presence of glycine as every third amino acid in the sequence of about 1000 amino acids. When the right-handed super-helix is formed, the glycine residues of each of the monomers are positioned at the center of the super-helix (where the three monomers "touch"). Each left-handed helix is characterized by a complete turn in about 3.3 amino acids. The periodicity induced by the glycines at non-integer spacing results in a super-helix that completes one turn in about 20 amino acids. This (Gly-X-Y)n sequence is repeated 343 times in the type III collagen molecule. Proline or hydroxyproline is often found in the X- and Y-position giving the triple helix stability.

Several fragments of human type III collagen have been solved by X-ray crystallography, including the C-terminal propeptide trimer that governs chain selection during procollagen assembly and a cystine-knot-containing triple-helical peptide near the C-terminus, which was found to adopt both 7/2 and 10/3 triple-helical symmetries. Full-length fibrillar collagen has not been crystallized because of its length and flexibility.

== Function ==
In addition to being an integral structural component of many organs, type III collagen is also an important regulator of the diameter of type I collagen fibrils. Type III collagen is also known to facilitate platelet aggregation through its binding to platelets and therefore, play an important role in blood clotting.

== Clinical significance ==
Mutations in the COL3A1 gene cause vascular Ehlers-Danlos syndrome (vEDS; OMIM 130050), classified under this name in the 2017 International Classification of the Ehlers–Danlos Syndromes and formerly designated EDS type IV. It is the most severe form of EDS, since patients often die suddenly due to rupture of large arteries or other hollow organs.

A few patients with arterial aneurysms without clear signs of EDS have also been found to have COL3A1 mutations.

More recently, mutations in COL3A1 have also been identified in patients with severe brain anomalies suggesting that type III collagen is important for the normal development of the brain during embryogenesis. This phenotype resembles the cortical malformation caused by loss-of-function mutations in ADGRG1 (formerly GPR56; OMIM 604110), the gene encoding adhesion G protein-coupled receptor G1. Type III collagen is a known ligand for this receptor, linking the finding to a shared brain-development pathway.

The first single base mutation in the COL3A1 gene was reported in 1989 in a patient with vEDS and changed a glycine amino acid to a serine Since then, more than 600 different variants have been reported in the COL3A1 gene. About 2/3 of these mutations change a glycine amino acid to another amino acid in the triple-helical region of the protein chain. A large number of RNA splicing mutations have also been identified. Interestingly, most of these mutations lead to exon skipping, and produce a shorter polypeptide, in which the Gly-Xaa-Yaa triplets stay in frame and there are no premature termination codons. Although vEDS is typically inherited in an autosomal-dominant manner, rare individuals with biallelic (homozygous or compound-heterozygous) COL3A1 variants – frequently null alleles – have an autosomal-recessive form of the disorder.

The functional consequences of COL3A1 mutations can be studied in a cell culture system. A small punch biopsy of skin is obtained from the patient and used to start the culture of skin fibroblasts which express type III collagen. The type III collagen protein synthesized by these cells can be studied for its thermal stability. In other words, the collagens can be subjected to a short digestion by proteinases called trypsin and chymotrypsin at increasing temperatures. Intact type III collagen molecules, which have formed a stable triple helix, can withstand such treatment till about 41 °C, whereas molecules with mutations that lead to glycine substitutions fall apart at a much lower temperature.

It is difficult to predict the clinical severity based on the type and location of COL3A1 mutations. Another important clinical implication is that several studies have reported on mosaicism. This refers to a situation where one of the parents carries the mutation in some, but not all of her or his cells, and appears phenotypically healthy, but has more than one affected offspring. In such a situation the risk for another affected child is higher than in a genotypically normal parent.

Type III collagen could also be important in several other human diseases. Increased amounts of type III collagen are found in many fibrotic conditions such as liver and kidney fibrosis, and systemic sclerosis. This has led to a search for serum biomarkers that could be used for diagnosing these conditions without having to obtain a tissue biopsy. The most widely used biomarker is the N-terminal propeptide of type III procollagen, which is cleaved off during the biosynthesis of type III collagen.

== Management ==
There is no cure for vascular EDS, and management centers on preventing and treating arterial and organ complications. The beta-blocker celiprolol is the most studied preventive therapy: in a prospective, randomized, open-label, blinded-endpoint trial, celiprolol reduced the incidence of arterial dissection and rupture in patients with vascular EDS, and the trial was stopped early for benefit. Subsequent long-term observational data associated celiprolol treatment with improved survival and a dose-dependent reduction in mortality. Because of the fragility of arterial and other tissues, elective surgery and invasive vascular procedures are approached with caution.

== Animal models ==
Four different mouse models with COL3A1 defects have been reported. Inactivation of the murine COL3A1 gene using homologous recombination technique led to a shorter life span in homozygous mutant mice. The mice died prematurely from a rupture of major arteries mimicking the human vEDS phenotype. These mice also had a severe malformation of the brain. Another study discovered mice with a naturally occurring large deletion of the COL3A1 gene. These mice died suddenly due to thoracic aortic dissections. The third type of mutant mice were transgenic mice with a Gly182Ser mutation. These mice developed severe skin wounds, demonstrated vascular fragility in the form of reduced tensile strength and died prematurely at the age of 13–14 weeks. The fourth mouse model with defective COL3A1 gene is the tight skin mouse (Tsk2/+), which resembles the human systemic sclerosis.

== See also ==
- Collagen
- Ehlers-Danlos syndrome
