= Intraepithelial lymphocyte =

Found in the epithelial layer of mucosal linings

Intraepithelial lymphocytes (IEL) are lymphocytes found in the epithelial layer of mammalian mucosal linings, such as the gastrointestinal (GI) tract and reproductive tract. However, unlike other T cells, IELs do not need priming. Upon encountering antigens, they immediately release cytokines and cause killing of infected target cells. In the GI tract, they are components of gut-associated lymphoid tissue (GALT).

Intestinal IELs are long-lived resistant effector cells spread along the entire length of intestine, where they patrol the space between intestinal epithelial cells (IEC) and the basement membrane (the intraepithelial space). Epithelium of small intestine contains approximately 1 IEL per 10 enterocytes. Due to their constant exposure to of antigens at mucosal barrier, they have unique antigen-experienced activated phenotypes and they constantly express CD103 (αE integrin), that is distinct from the conventional T cells in the intestine. IELs are mainly T cells with mixture of subsets. They are divided into two groups – conventional and unconventional IELs.

In mice both groups are retained in almost equal proportions. In humans, the majority of IELs are alpha beta T cells. 15% of IELs are gamma delta T cells and thus represent a minor component of human IELs. However, IELs significantly increase under certain conditions, such as celiac disease.

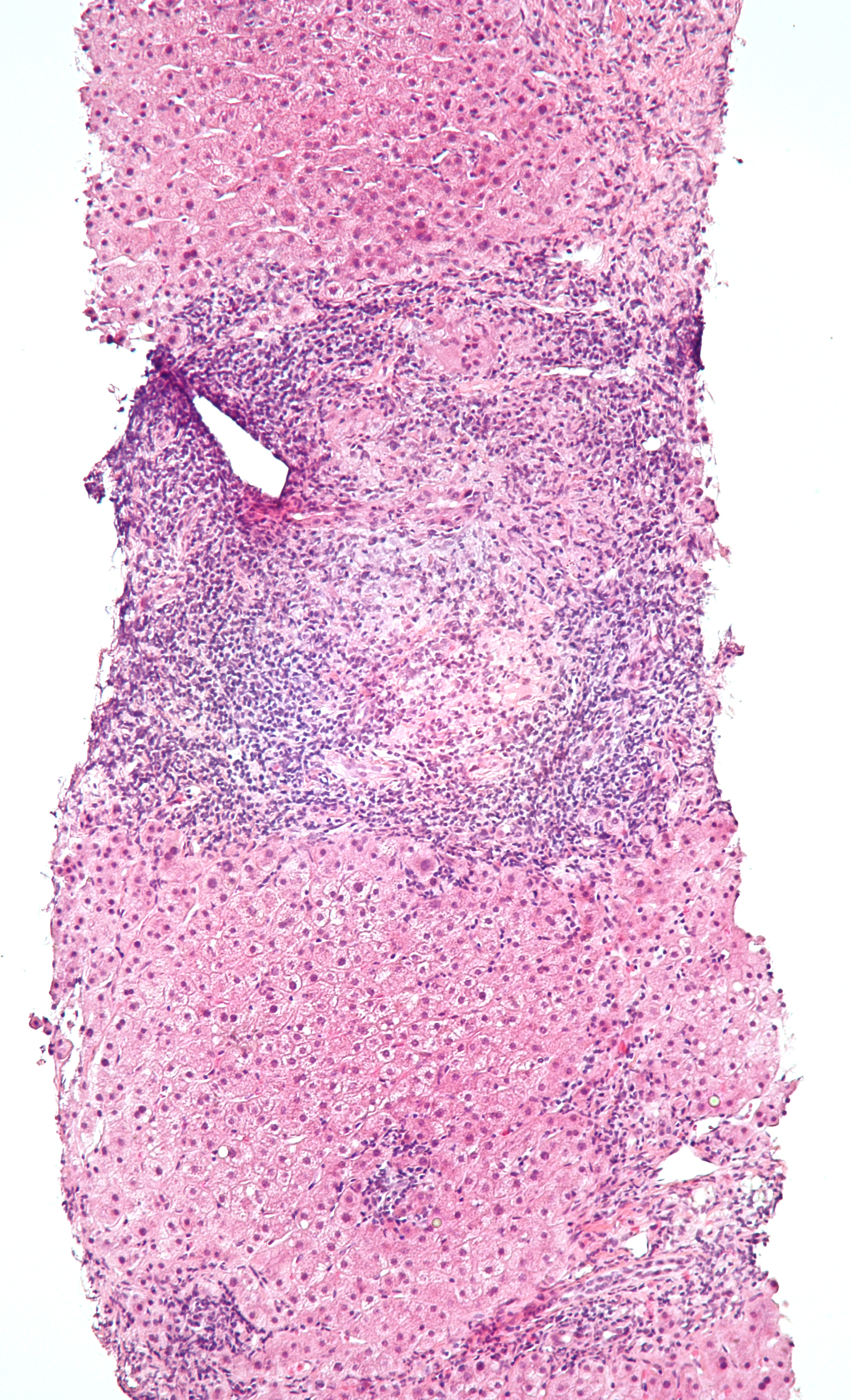
primary biliary cirrhosis. Bile duct intraepithelial lymphocytes

== Phenotype ==
The majority of IELs (80%) are CD3+, and over 75% of these also express CD8. IELs can be divided into two major subsets based on their CD8 coreceptor expression. One subset of IELs typically express activation marker CD8αα and some IELs express CD8αβ^{+} marker (CD8αβ promotes TCR activation, whereas CD8αα suppresses TCR signals).

In both humans and mice IELs express higher levels of CD103, activation marker CD69, granzyme B and perforin cytolytic granules. CD25 expression is lower in comparison with effector memory T cells.

=== CD8αα ===
Expression of CD8αα is an important phenotypic marker of IELs, but not all IELs subpopulations express this molecule. CD8αα homodimer is an alternative isoform to classical CD8αβ heterodimer, which is expressed on conventional CD8 T-cells. CD8αα is mainly expressed by effector or mature antigen-experienced cells in the gut. This molecule can bind MHC I, but, opposed to the function of CD8αβ, CD8αα reduces sensitivity of TCR towards antigens. Thus, when recognizing MHC I, CD8αα functions as a repressor of activation.

CD8αα can also recognize thymus leukemia (TL) antigen, which is a non-classical MHC I molecule that is expressed in thymus and in intestinal epithelium. Interaction between TL and CD8αα does not serve for migration of IELs into the epithelium, but it is important for modulating immune response of IELs. It has been suggested that cross-talk between TL and CD8αα might regulate IELs survival and proliferation. More accurately, TL prevents proliferation of IELs, when there is co-occurrence of weak TCR stimulation.

== Development ==
Induced IELs (TCRαβ+ CD8αβ^{+}) are generated from naive T cells during an immune response. TCRαβ^{+} CD8αα (natural IELs) cells differentiate in the thymus.

Development and cytolytic activation are independent of live micro-organisms but they become cytolytic in response to the exogenous antigenic substances other than live micro-organisms in the gut. IEL T cells acquire their activated memory phenotype post-thymically, in response to antigens encountered in the periphery.

== Function ==
Their role in immune system is crucial because IELs provide a first line of defense at this extensive barrier with the outside world. All IEL T cells are antigen-experienced T cells, which typically display a cytotoxic functional phenotype. IELs mediate antigen-specific delayed-type hypersensitivity (DTH) responses, exhibit virus-specific CTL function, to express natural killer (NK)-like activity and produce a local graft-versus-host reaction (GVHR) when transferred to semiallogeneic hosts. IELs are also able to produce a variety of cytokines which are characteristically produced by T_{h}1- and T_{h}2-type cells and can also provide help for B cell responses.

== Pathology ==
An elevated IEL population, as determined by biopsy, typically indicates ongoing inflammation within the mucosa. In diseases such as celiac sprue, IEL elevation throughout the small intestine is one of many specific markers. IELs have heightened activated status that can lead to inflammatory disease such as IBD, promote cancer development and progression, or become the malignant cells in enteropathy-associated T-cell lymphoma, a lymphoma that is a complication of celiac sprue.

Alternatively, elevated IEL populations can be a marker for developing neoplasia in the tissue such as found in cervical and prostate cancers, as well as some colorectal cancers, particularly those associated with Lynch syndrome (hereditary non-polyposis colon cancer <HNPCC>). IELs themselves can, when chronically activated, undergo mutation that can lead to lymphoma.

== Classification ==
IELs can be divided into different subpopulations based on molecular markers expression, mainly by expression of TCR and CD8αα, and by origin.

=== Induced TCR^{+} IELs ===
Also termed conventional IELs, express TCRαβ together with CD4 or CD8αβ and are derived from antigen-experienced T cells that home to intraepithelial space. Contrary to natural IELs, induced IELs are the progeny of MHCI-restricted CD8αβ or MHCII-restricted CD4 naïve T cells that further undergo a post-thymic differentiation. These cells express activation markers (CD44, CD69) and unlike natural TCR^{+}IELs express CD2, CD5, CD28, LFA-1, and Thy1. Upon the entry into the intestinal epithelium, these cells can start express also CD8αα.

==== TCRαβ^{+}CD4^{+} IELs ====
TCRαβ^{+}CD4^{+} IELs arise from conventional peripheral CD4^{+} T-cells. These cells migrate into the intestinal epithelium as effector or tissue-resident memory T cells.

In mice, up to 50% of these IELs can express CD8αα homodimer, which they acquire in the intestinal epithelium after external stimuli such as TGF-β, IFN-γ, IL-27 and retinoic acid. Function of TCRαβ^{+} CD4^{+} CD8αα^{+} IELs is unclear. Even though they express granzymes and have cytolytic properties, it has been suggested that they can also have regulatory properties in the context of chronic intestinal inflammation.

==== TCRαβ^{+}CD8αβ^{+} IELs ====
These IELs emerge from peripherally activated conventional CD8^{+} T-cells and home to the intestinal epithelium, where they function as effector or memory cells. They continuously express integrin β7, granzyme B, CD103 and CD69 and produce lower amounts of TNF-α and IFN-γ as opposed to the conventional CD8^{+} T-cells.

Some of these cells also express CD8αα homodimer and can be pathogenic during coeliac disease in humans.

==== Double positive (DP) TCRαβ^{+}CD4^{+}CD8αα^{+} IELs ====
These DP IELs are subset of induced IELs, which are CD4^{+} IELs with some functions of CD8^{+} IELs and under physiological condition their number in the intestine is very small. During the intestinal inflammation, levels of DP IELs significantly increase.

DP IELs develop independently of the thymus and contrary to natural IELs, these cells increase with age, especially when they are exposed to exogenous antigens. Their migration into the intestinal epithelium depends mainly on the luminal bacteria and the dietary antigens.

DP IELs induction is directed by the transcriptional regulation. During the development of IELs, CD4^{+} T cells downregulate ThPOK and instead start to express Runx3 transcription factor, because CD4^{+}CD8aa^{+} IELs have low levels of ThPOK expression while the expression of Runx3 is very high. T-bet inducing environment is also required for the Runx3 upregulation, most likely containing IFN-y, IL-27, IL-15 and Retionic acid (RA). RA have the ability to induce an expression of the intetsine-homing receptors, such as α4β7-integrin and CC-chemokine receptor 9 (CCR9). Another transcription factor responsible for DP IELs induction is the Aryl hydrocarbon receptor (AhR). AhR is ligand-dependent transcription factor, and its activation is responsible for ThPOK downregulation. AhR is activated by indole metabolites of tryptophan induced by microbiota, such as Lactobacillus reuteri. Therefore, the DP IELs induction is dependent on the microbiota composition and the diet.

The function of CD4CD8aa IELs is due to their CD8 phenotype and granzyme B expression to prevent pathogens from invading and to maintain integrity of the intestinal epithelial barrier. Their CD4 phenotype is responsible for IL-10 and TGF-β secretion that prevents Th1-induced inflammation in the intestine, therefore their role can be complementary to T regulatory cells.

DP IELs probably play role in intestinal homeostasis because of their immunosuppressive function. But for their cytotoxic responses they may play an important role in the pathological process of IBD.

=== Natural TCR^{+} IELs ===
Also termed unconventional IELs, express either TCRαβ or TCRγδ and do not express either CD4 or CD8αβ, but express CD8αα homodimers. In contrast to induced TCR^{+} IELs lack expression of CD2, CD5, CD28, LFA-1, and Thy1.

==== TCRαβ^{+} IELs ====
In mice, these IELs are the most abundant at birth and with age their numbers decrease. In humans, these cells are present during gestation but are very rare in adulthood. TCRαβ^{+} IELs develop in thymus where they undergo agonist positive selection and thereby are self-reactive. Nevertheless, they have regulatory properties and protect against colitis in animal experiments. These cells are influenced by normal intestinal microbiota and vitamin D. NOD2 receptor expressed by antigen presenting cells and epithelial cells in the intestine recognizes microbes and triggers the production of IL-15 cytokine, which promotes TCRαβ^{+}CD8αα^{+} IELs.

==== TCRγδ^{+} IELs ====
TCRγδ^{+} IELs develop outside of thymus and their maintenance and function in the intestinal epithelium is influenced by a cross-talk with enterocytes. Moreover, they can migrate through the epithelium with the help of interactions with epithelial cells. Most of these cells express Vγ7 in mice and Vγ4 in humans. Their function resides in the protection of the intestinal barrier against pathogens early in the infection and later they quench the inflammation and protect the barrier from tissue damage. The mechanism is not clear, but TCRγδ^{+} IELs have cytotoxic properties and can produce cytokines TGF-β, TNF-α, IFN-γ, IL-13 and IL-10 and antimicrobial peptides, all of which can contribute to the diverse functions.

Similar functions have been found in the context of colitis, where these cells seem to have pathogenic role at the beginning, whereas later they protect the epithelium against tissue damage.

=== TCR^{−} IELs ===
IELs that do not express TCR.

==== ILC-like IELs ====
These cells show properties of NK cells. In humans, they are elevated during Crohn´s disease and in mice, they are pathogenic during colitis.

==== iCD8α ====
These innate lymphocytes express homodimer CD8αα and CD3 and develop outside of thymus. They have cytotoxic and phagocytic properties, express MHC II and thereby can present antigens to conventional CD4^{+} T-cells. iCD8α protect against bacterial infections and promotes experimental colitis.

==== TCR^{−}iCD3^{+}CD8αα^{−} IELs ====
These cells are very similar to iCD8α population and it is unclear if this is a different subset of cells or only precursors of iCD8α.

== See also ==
IEL of the GI tract
