= Memory T cell =

Subset of T lymphocytes

Memory T cells are a subset of T lymphocytes that might have some of the same functions as memory B cells. Their lineage is unclear.

== Function ==
Antigen-specific memory T cells specific to viruses or other microbial molecules can be found in both central memory T cells (T_{CM}) and effector memory T cells (T_{EM}) subsets. Although most information is currently based on observations in the cytotoxic T cells (CD8-positive) subset, similar populations appear to exist for both the helper T cells (CD4-positive) and the cytotoxic T cells. Primary function of memory cells is augmented immune response after reactivation of those cells by reintroduction of relevant pathogen into the body.

- Central memory T cells (T_{CM}): T_{CM} lymphocytes have several attributes in common with stem cells, the most important being the ability of self-renewal, mainly because of high level of phosphorylation on key transcription factor STAT5. In mice, T_{CM} proved to confer more powerful immunity against viruses, bacteria and cancer cells, compared to T_{EM} lymphocytes in several experimental models.
- Effector memory T cells (T_{EM}): T_{EM} and T_{EMRA} lymphocytes are primarily active as the CD8 variants, thus being mainly responsible for cytotoxic action against pathogens.
- Tissue-resident memory T cell (T_{RM}): Because T_{RM} lymphocytes are present over long periods of time in tissues, or more importantly, barrier tissues (epithelium for example), they are crucial for quick response to barrier breach and response to any relevant pathogen present. One mechanism used by T_{RM} to restrict pathogens is the secretion of granzyme B.
- Stem cell-like memory T cells (T_{SCM}): Those lymphocytes are capable of self-renewal as are the T_{CM} lymphocytes and are also capable of generating both the T_{CM} and T_{EM} subpopulations. Presence of this population in humans is currently under investigation.
- Virtual memory T cell (T_{VM}): As of now, the only function apparent in T_{VM} cells is production of various cytokines, but there are speculations about their influence in subduing unwanted immunological states and their usage in treating autoimmune disorders.

=== Homeostatic maintenance ===
Clones of memory T cells expressing a specific T cell receptor can persist for decades in our body. Since memory T cells have shorter half-lives than naïve T cells do, continuous replication and replacement of old cells are likely involved in the maintenance process. Currently, the mechanism behind memory T cell maintenance is not fully understood. Activation through the T cell receptor may play a role. It is found that memory T cells can sometimes react to novel antigens, potentially caused by the intrinsic diversity and breadth of the T cell receptor binding targets. These T cells could cross-react to environmental or resident antigens in our bodies (like bacteria in our gut) and proliferate. These events would help maintain the memory T cell population. The cross-reactivity mechanism may be important for memory T cells in the mucosal tissues since these sites have higher antigen density. For those resident in blood, bone marrow, lymphoid tissues, and spleen, homeostatic cytokines (including IL-17 and IL-15) or major histocompatibility complex II (MHCII) signaling may be more important.

=== Lifetime overview ===
Memory T cells undergo different changes and play different roles in different life stages for humans. At birth and early childhood, T cells in the peripheral blood are mainly naïve T cells. Through frequent antigen exposure, the population of memory T cells accumulates. This is the memory generation stage, which lasts from birth to about 20–25 years old when our immune system encounters the greatest number of new antigens. During the memory homeostasis stage that comes next, the number of memory T cells plateaus and is stabilized by homeostatic maintenance. At this stage, the immune response shifts more towards maintaining homeostasis since few new antigens are encountered. Tumor surveillance also becomes important at this stage. At later stages of life, at about 65–70 years of age, immunosenescence stage comes, in which stage immune dysregulation, decline in T cell function and increased susceptibility to pathogens are observed.

== Lineage debate ==
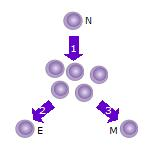
On-Off-On model: 1. After the naive T cell (N) encounters an antigen it becomes activated and begins to proliferate (divide) into many clones or daughter cells.; 2. Some of the T cell clones will differentiate into effector T cells (E) that will perform the function of that cell (e.g. produce cytokines in the case of helper T cells or invoke cell killing in the case of cytotoxic T cells).; 3. Some of the cells will form memory T cells (M) that will survive in an inactive state in the host for a long period of time until they re-encounter the same antigen and reactivate.

As of April 2020, the lineage relationship between effector and memory T cells is unclear. Two competing models exist. One is called the On-Off-On model. When naive T cells are activated by T cell receptor (TCR) binding to antigen and its downstream signaling pathway, they actively proliferate and form a large clone of effector cells. Effector cells undergo active cytokine secretion and other effector activities. After antigen clearance, some of these effector cells form memory T cells, either in a randomly determined manner or are selected based on their superior specificity. These cells would reverse from the active effector role to a state more similar to naive T cells and would be "turned on" again upon the next antigen exposure. This model predicts that effector T cells can transit into memory T cells and survive, retaining the ability to proliferate. It also predicts that certain gene expression profiles would follow the on-off-on pattern during naive, effector, and memory stages. Evidence supporting this model includes the finding of genes related to survival and homing that follow the on-off-on expression pattern, including interleukin-7 receptor alpha (IL-7Rα), Bcl-2, CD26L, and others.

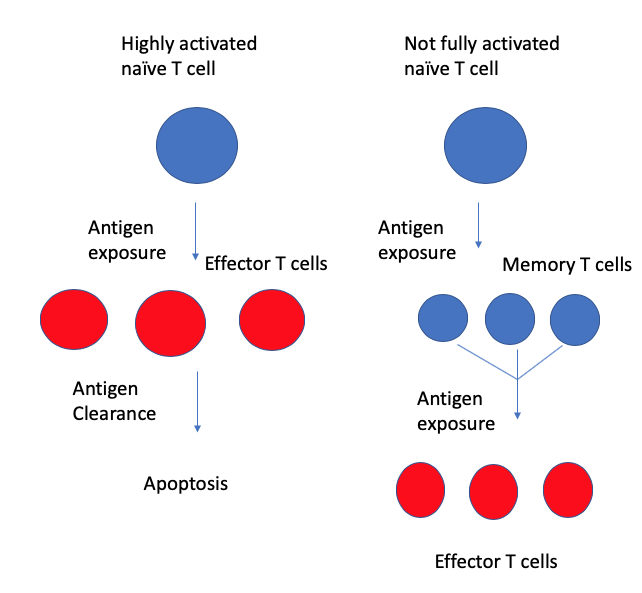
Developmental differentiation model: In this model, memory T cells generate effector T cells, not the other way around.

The other model is the developmental differentiation model. This model argues that effector cells produced by the highly activated naive T cells would all undergo apoptosis after antigen clearance. Memory T cells are instead produced by naive T cells that are activated but never entered with full strength into the effector stage. The progeny of memory T cells are not fully activated because they are not as specific to the antigen as the expanding effector T cells. Studies looking at cell division history found that the length of telomere and activity of telomerase were reduced in effector T cells compared to memory T cells, which suggests that memory T cells did not undergo as much cell division as effector T cells, which is inconsistent with the On-Off-On model. Repeated or chronic antigenic stimulation of T cells, like HIV infection, would induce elevated effector functions but reduce memory. It was also found that massively proliferated T cells are more likely to generate short-lived effector cells, while minimally proliferated T cells would form more long-lived cells.

== Epigenetic modifications ==
Epigenetic modifications are involved in the change from naive T-cells. For example, in CD4^{+} memory T cells, positive histone modifications mark key cytokine genes that are up-regulated during the secondary immune response, including IFNγ, IL4, and IL17A. Some of these modifications persisted after antigen clearance, establishing an epigenetic memory that allows a faster activation upon re-encounter with the antigen. For CD8^{+} memory T cells, certain effector genes, such as IFNγ, would not be expressed but they are transcriptionally poised for fast expression upon activation. Additionally, the enhancement of expression for certain genes also depends on the strength of the initial TCR signaling for the progeny of memory T cells, which is correlated to the regulatory element activation that directly changes gene expression level.

== Sub-populations ==
Historically, memory T cells were thought to belong to either the effector (T_{EM} cells) or central memory (T_{CM} cells) subtypes, each with its own distinguishing set of cell surface markers (see below). Subsequently, numerous additional populations of memory T cells were discovered including tissue-resident memory T (T_{RM}) cells, stem memory T_{SCM} cells, and virtual memory T cells. The single unifying theme for all memory T cell subtypes is that they are long-lived and can quickly expand to large numbers of effector T cells upon re-exposure to their cognate antigen. By this mechanism, they provide the immune system with "memory" against previously encountered pathogens. Memory T cells may be either CD4^{+} or CD8^{+} and usually express CD45RO and at the same time lack CD45RA.

=== Memory T cell subtypes ===
- Central memory T cells (T_{CM} cells) express CD45RO, C-C chemokine receptor type 7 (CCR7), and L-selectin (CD62L). Central memory T cells also have intermediate to high expression of CD44. This memory subpopulation is commonly found in the lymph nodes and in the peripheral circulation.
- Effector memory T cells (T_{EM} cells) express CD45RO but lack expression of CCR7 and L-selectin. They also have intermediate to high expression of CD44. Because these memory T cells lack the CCR7 lymph node-homing receptors they are found in the peripheral circulation and tissues. T_{EMRA} stands for terminally differentiated effector memory cells re-expressing CD45RA, which is a marker usually found on naive T cells.
- Peripheral memory T cells (T_{PM} cells) subtype was identified based on intermediate CX3CR1 expression. These cells can migrate to the tissues from blood and traffic to the lymph nodes in a CD62L-independent manner, in order to survey the tissues.
- Tissue-resident memory T cells (T_{RM}) occupy tissues (skin, lung, gastrointestinal tract, etc.) without recirculating. Some cell surface markers that have been associated with T_{RM} are CD69 and integrin αeβ7 (CD103). However, it is worth noticing that T_{RM} cells found in different tissues express different sets of cell surface markers. While CD103+ T_{RM} cells are found to be restrictedly localized to epithelial and neuronal tissues, T_{RM} cells localized in salivary glands, pancreas, and female reproductive tracts in mice express neither CD69 nor CD103. T_{RM} cells are thought to play a major role in protective immunity against pathogens. Studies have also suggested a dual role for T_{RM} cells in protection and regulation. Compared to T_{EM} cells, T_{RM} cells secrete higher levels of protective-immunity-related cytokines and express lower levels of the proliferation marker Ki67. It was proposed that these characteristics may help with the long-term maintenance of T_{RM} cells, as well as keeping a balance between quick response to antigen invasion and avoidance of unnecessary tissue damage. Dysfunctional T_{RM} cells have been implicated in autoimmune diseases, such as psoriasis, rheumatoid arthritis, and inflammatory bowel disease. Specific to T_{RM} lymphocytes are genes involved in lipid metabolism, being highly active, roughly 20- to 30-fold more active than in other types of T-cells.
- Virtual memory T cells (T_{VM}) differ from the other memory subsets in that they do not originate following a strong clonal expansion event. Thus, although this population as a whole is abundant within the peripheral circulation, individual virtual memory T cell clones reside at relatively low frequencies. One theory is that homeostatic proliferation gives rise to this T cell population. Although CD8 virtual memory T cells were the first to be described, it is now known that CD4 virtual memory cells also exist.

There have been numerous other subpopulations of memory T cells suggested. Investigators have studied Stem memory T_{SCM} cells. Like naive T cells, T_{SCM} cells are CD45RO−, CCR7+, CD45RA+, CD62L+ (L-selectin), CD27+, CD28+, and IL-7Rα+, but they also express large amounts of CD95, IL-2Rβ, CXCR3, and LFA-1, and show numerous functional attributes distinctive of memory cells.

== TCR-independent (bystander) activation ==
T cells possess the ability to be activated independently of their cognate antigen stimulation, i.e. without TCR stimulation. At early stages of infection, T cells specific for unrelated antigen are activated only by the presence of inflammation. This happens in the inflammatory milieu resulting from microbial infection, cancer or autoimmunity in both mice and humans and occurs locally as well as systematically . Moreover, bystander activated T cells can migrate to the site of infection, due to increased CCR5 expression.

This phenomenon was observed predominantly in memory CD8+ T cells, which have lower sensitivity to cytokine stimulation, compared to their naive counterparts and get activated in this manner more easily. Virtual memory CD8+ T cells also display heightened sensitivity to cytokine-induced activation in mouse models, but this was not directly demonstrated in humans. Conversely, TCR-independent activation of naive CD8+ T cells remains controversial.

Apart from infections, bystander activation also plays an important role in antitumor immunity. In human cancerous tissues, a high number of virus-specific, not tumor-specific, CD8+ T cells was detected. This type of activation is considered to be beneficial for the host in terms of cancer clearance efficiency.

=== Drivers of bystander activation ===
The major drivers of bystander activation are cytokines, such as IL-15, IL-18, IL-12 or type I IFNs, often working synergistically. IL-15 is responsible for cytotoxic activity of bystander-activated T cells. It induces the NKG2D (a receptor typically expressed on NK cells) expression on memory CD8+ T cells, leading to innate-like cytotoxicity, i.e. recognition of NKG2D ligands as indicators of infection, cell stress and cell transformation as well as destruction of altered cells in an NK-like manner. TCR activation was shown to abrogate IL-15 mediated NKG2D expression on T cells. Additionally, IL-15 induces expression of cytolytic molecules, cell expansion and enhances the cell response to IL-18. IL-18 is another cytokine involved in this process, typically acting in synergy with IL-12, enhancing the differentiation of memory T cells into effector cells, i.e. it induces IFN-γ production and cell proliferation. Toll-like receptors (TLRs), especially TLR2, have been linked to TCR-independent activation of CD8+ T cells upon bacterial infection as well.

=== Bystander activation of CD4+ T cells ===
Despite TCR-independent activation being studied more extensively in CD8+ T cells, there's a clear evidence of this phenomenon occurring in CD4+ T cells. However, it's considered to be less efficient, presumably due to lower CD122 (also known as IL2RB or IL15RB) expression. Similarly to their CD8+ counterparts, memory and effector CD4+ T cells exhibit increased sensitivity to TCR-independent activation. IL-1β, synergistically with IL-12 and IL-23, stimulates memory CD4+ T cells and drives Th17 response. Moreover, IL-18, IL-12 and IL-27 induce cytokine expression in effector and memory CD4+ T cells and IL-2 is considered to be a strong activation inducer of CD4+ T cells that can replace TCR stimulation even in naive cells. TLR2 was also reported to be present on memory CD4+ T cells, which respond to their agonist by IFNγ production, even without TCR stimulation.

=== Role in pathogenicity ===
Bystander activation plays role in the elimination of the spread of infection in its early stages and helps in tumor clearance. However, this type of activation can also have deleterious outcome, especially in chronic infections and autoimmune diseases. Liver injury during chronic Hepatitis B virus infection is a result of non-HBV-specific CD8+ T cell infiltration into the tissue. A similar situation occurs during the acute Hepatitis A virus infection and activated virus unrelated CD4+ T cells contribute to ocular lesions in Herpes Simplex Virus infections.

Increased IL-15 expression and subsequent excessive NKG2D expression was linked to exacerbation of some autoimmune disorders, such as, type I diabetes, multiple sclerosis and inflammatory bowel diseases, for instance Crohn's disease and celiac disease. Furthermore, enhanced TLR2 expression was observed in joints, cartilage and bones of rheumatoid arthritis patients and the presence of its ligand, peptidoglycan, was detected in their synovial fluid.
