= T memory stem cell =

A T memory stem cell (T_{SCM}) is a type of long-lived memory T cell with the ability to reconstitute the full diversity of memory and effector T cell subpopulations as well as to maintain their own pool through self-renewal. First described in mice in 2009, then in humans, T_{SCM} cells represent a cell type that has reshaped the research landscapes of immunology and medicine because of their superior ability to self-renew and persist in the settings of cancer and infectious disease. Developmentally, T_{SCM} cells are an intermediate subset between naïve (T_{n}) and central memory (T_{cm}) T cells, expressing both naïve T cells markers, such as CD45RA+, CD45RO-, high levels of CD27, CD28, IL-7Rα (CD127), CD62L, and C-C chemokine receptor type 7 (CCR7), as well as markers of memory T cells, such as CD95, CD122 (IL-2Rβ), CXCR3, LFA-1. These cells represent approximately 2–3% of circulating T cells. Like naïve T cells, T_{SCM} cells are found more abundantly in lymph nodes than in the spleen or bone marrow; but in contrast to naïve T cells, T_{SCM} cells are clonally expanded. Similarly to memory T cells, T_{SCM} are able to rapidly proliferate and secrete pro-inflammatory cytokines IFN-γ, IL-2, and TNF-α in response to antigen re-exposure, but show higher proliferation potential compared with T_{cm} cells; their homeostatic turnover is also dependent on IL-7 and IL-15.

== Differentiation ==
Longitudinal studies on T_{SCM} dynamics in patients undergoing hematopoietic stem cell transplantation (HSCT) have shown that donor-derived T_{SCM} cells were highly enriched early after HSCT, differentiated directly from T_{n}, and that T_{n} and T_{SCM} cells (but not central memory or effector T cells) could reconstitute the entire diversity of memory T cell subsets, including T_{SCM} cells. Together with the transcriptome analysis of differentially expressed genes, which highlighted the close relationship between TSCM cells and T_{n} cells, the findings stood in sharp contrast to the prevailing hierarchical model of human T‑cell differentiation. That traditional model envisions a linear progression: T_{n} give rise to effector T cells (T_{eff}), which then transition into effector memory T cells, and ultimately into central memory T cells (T_{cm}).

After primary antigen exposure and elimination, antigen-specific T_{SCM} preferentially survive among memory T cells and stably persist throughout the human lifespan. Multiparametric flow cytometry and T-cell receptor (TCR) sequencing studies haven showed that more than 30% of T_{n} cells primed by antigen directly differentiate into T_{SCM} cells. Current observations suggest that T_{SCM} are a population that plays an essential role in maintaining long-term memory in vivo. Long-term studies on T cells in a cohort of patients vaccinated against yellow fever revealed that vaccine-induced CD8+ T_{SCM} cells specific to yellow fever antigens were stably maintained for 25 years, capable of self-renewal ex vivo, and preserved surface markers and messenger RNA profiles closest to T_{n} cells. In another longitudinal study of leukaemia patients who had undergone HSCT, it was reported that genetically modified T_{SCM} could be detected up to 14 years after infusion. Complex analysis of T_{SCM} dynamics under physiological conditions, including stable isotope labeling, mathematical modeling, cross-sectional data from vaccinated individuals, and telomere length analysis, revealed that there are at least 2 distinct T_{SCM} subpopulations with different longevity and turnover rates:

1. Short-lived, with an average half-life of 5 months.
2. Long-lived, with a high degree of self-renewal and the half-life of approximately 9 years—consistent with the long-term maintenance of the recall response to antigen (8–15 years).

Analysis of the TCRβ repertoire of T_{SCM} and T_{m} revealed that T_{SCM} have greater TCRβ diversity compared with T_{m}; that TCR sequences of T_{SCM} were antigen-experienced; and that their composition differed from that of T_{n}. It also revealed that in type 1 diabetes patients, there was an enrichment of self-reactive clonotypes in T_{SCM} rather than in T_{m}, suggesting that T_{SCM} might serve as a pool of autoreactive T cells.

== In host defense ==
Pathogen-specific T_{SCM} cells have been identified in a number of studies of human acute and chronic infections caused by viruses, bacteria, and parasites. The presence of T_{SCM} might be essential for the control of persisting infections, in which effector T cells undergo exhaustion and need to be restored; this was supported by evidence of a negative correlation between the severity of chronic viral (e.g., HIV-1) and parasitic (trypanosome) infections and the frequency of circulating T_{SCM} cells.

== T_{SCM} in cancer ==
T_{SCM} are considered as a promising approach in immune cell therapy in cancers due to their high proliferation capacity, longevity and increased survival as well as more potent antitumor effects compared with Tcm and Tem in vivo. Studies on adoptive cell therapy in mouse melanoma model revealed a significant linear correlation between the differentiation status of infused T cells and the strength of tumor regression in the order T_{SCM} >T_{CM} > T_{EM}; T_{SCM} infusion led to a more sustained reduction in tumor growth and correlated with a significant increase in overall survival of treated mice. Previous works on humans and mice also demonstrated that less differentiated T cells show greater proliferative capacity and ability to persist after cell transfer compared with their more differentiated counterparts; in humans, the ability of infused T cells to persist has been positively correlated with response to adoptive cell therapy.

However, the clinical exploitation of T_{SCM} cells is impeded due to their paucity in the peripheral blood and due to the current lack of unified protocols for generating and maintaining T_{SCM} in vitro for clinical manufacturing. Among current efficient strategies, there is a combination of IL-7 and IL-15, which have been successfully used to generate tumor-redirected T_{SCM} cells from naive cell precursors, with yielding cells having a gene signature of naturally occurring T_{SCM} cells and enhanced proliferative capacity compared to other T cell subsets. This strategy can be particularly suitable for generating virus-specific T_{SCM} cells for adoptive cell therapy to prevent or treat viral infections after transplantation or in other immunocompromised patients. Another strategy promoting the efficient generation of tumor-reactive T_{SCM} cells relies on the activation of naïve-like T cells in the presence of IL-7, IL-21 and TWS119 which is an agonist of Wnt-β signaling. It has been found that CAR-modified T_{SCM} cells generated this way are phenotypically, functionally and transcriptomically equivalent to naturally occurring T_{SCM} cells; moreover, they had metabolic features which are specific for long-lived memory T cells, such as high spare respiratory capacity and low glycolytic metabolism (predominance of oxidative phosphorylation). Such CAR-modified T cells can be redirected efficiently against required tumor antigens, and have been shown to generate durable anti-tumor responses.

One of the hardest challenges in application of T cell therapies in treatment of solid tumors is the problem of CD8+ T cells exhaustion resulting from their repeated exposure to tumor antigens and immunosuppressive tumor microenvironment sending inhibitory signals through the cytokines and cell surface receptors. Exhausted T cells are characterized by the expression of large amounts of inhibitory molecules such as PD-1, CTLA-4, LAG3, Tim-3, CD244/2B4, CD160, and TIGIT; they do not respond to TCR stimulation and have reduced capacity to secrete anti-tumor cytokines such as IFN-γ and TNF-α. On a transcriptional level, recent studies have found that transcription factors which play key role in T cells exhaustion include TCF-1, T-bet, Eomes, PRDM1, NFAT, NR4A, IRF4 and BATF. According to the current differentiation model of T cells exhaustion, T cells stepwise lose their "stemness" while acquiring "exhaustion". Therefore, approaches that would avoid T cells exhaustion and would "reinvigorate" exhausted T cells have a potential to significantly improve the efficacy of cancer immunotherapies.

Studies of the recent years revealed that TCF-1+ T cells, which represent early memory T cells including T_{SCM} cells, play important roles in T cells persistence and efficacy in cancer immunotherapy. Flow cytometry analysis of tumor-infiltrating antigen-presenting cell (APC) populations in human kidney, prostate and bladder tumors revealed a significant correlation between the presence of dendritic cells (but not macrophages) and the number of TCF1^{+} stem-like CD8+ T cells in the tumor. Subsequent immunofluorescence staining showed that TCF1^{+} stem-like T cells were found only in regions with high density of MHC II+ cells; in contrast, the TCF1- population of terminally exhausted CD8+ T cells was distributed across the tissue with no preference for APC dense zones. Expanded analysis of large sections of tumor tissues confirmed that tumors had many regions with dense APC zones, and TCF-1+ stem-like CD8 cells preferentially resided there. These data suggest that regions highly enriched with APC serve as an intratumoral niche for stem-like CD8+ T cells, which give rise to terminally differentiated T cells and thus sustain the anti-tumor immune response. Furthermore, immunofluorescence analysis of large regions of tumor tissue from 26 patients with kidney cancer revealed that patients with controlled disease had significantly more MHC-II dense regions where TCF1^{+} CD8 T cells resided; further stratification of patients showed that patients with low MHC-II^{+} cell density in such regions experienced significantly impaired progression-free survival. A focused study of patients with stage III kidney cancer, around 50% of whom progress after surgery, revealed that there were >10-fold fewer immune niches in patients who progressed.

Despite some variations depending on tumor type and therapy, most studies agree that tumor-infiltrating lymphocytes (TIL) in patients responding to checkpoint-blockade therapy, such as anti-PD1 therapy, contain more TCF1+ early memory T cells, while fewer T cells with exhausted phenotype compared with TILs in non-responders. A study performed on the preclinical model of colon cancer has shown that PD-1 blockade induced a shift from naïve-like to memory precursor-like subsets, which are maintained by the transcriptional regulator TCF-1. The effectiveness of CAR-T cell therapy in chronic lymphocytic leukemia has also been reported to depend on the number of early memory T cells and T cell exhaustion.
