= Tissue-resident memory T cell =

Tissue-resident memory T cells or T_{RM} cells represent a subset of a long-lived memory T cells that occupies epithelial, mucosal and other tissues (skin, mucosa, lung, brain, pancreas, gastrointestinal tract) without recirculating. T_{RM} cells are transcriptionally, phenotypically and functionally distinct from central memory (T_{CM}) and effector memory (T_{EM}) T cells which recirculate between blood, the T cell zones of secondary lymphoid organ, lymph and nonlymphoid tissues. Moreover, T_{RM} cells consist of diverse populations both between tissues and within a single tissue. T_{RM} cells provide protection against infection in extralymphoid tissues.

== Phenotype ==
Three cell surface markers that has been associated with T_{RM} are CD69, CD49a, and CD103. CD69 suppresses response to the S1P chemoattractant from blood and lymph and prevents T_{RM} cells from exiting peripheral tissue. CD49a mediates tissue residency directly and marks cells with the most effector-like capabilities including IFN-gamma production and the ability to directly kill infected cells. CD103 is expressed by many CD8^{+} T_{RM} cells and rarely by CD4^{+} T_{RM} cells, usually in conjunction with CD49a. T_{RM} cells have tissue residency-promoting transcriptional signature with features specific to individual tissues and features necessary for long-term survival in these tissues.

- Skin T_{RM}: T_{RM} cells in the skin express cutaneous lymphocyte antigen (CLA) and CCR8 which are skin homing antigens. They have also higher expression of markers CD103 and CD69, integrins, cytokine/growth factor receptors and signaling molecules CD49a, CD122 and PD-1. On the other hand, they have downregulated chemokine receptors CCR7 and S1P1 which are important for recirculation. Skin T_{RM} cells can survive in the skin for years depending upon IL-15 and fatty acid metabolism. IL-15 and TGF-β are required for differentiation of T_{RM} cells in the skin in mouse models.
- Lung T_{RM}: Lung T_{RM} cells play important role in protection against respiratory infections. CD4^{+} follicular helper T_{RM} cells promotes protection against virus infection by inducing B cells and CD8^{+} T cells. CD8^{+} T_{RM} cells produce IFN-gamma which assists in viral clearance. T_{RM} cells can also recruit neutrophils in case of bacterial infection. However, pathologic inflammation caused by lung T_{RM} cells can lead to development of asthma or fibrosis. Human lung T_{RM} CD4^{+} CD103^{+} cells express higher levels of CD103, CTLA4, KLRC1 and ICOS. CTLA4 is an inhibitor protein which role may lie in limitation of excessive effector and cytolytic activity which could lead to immune pathologies. On the other hand, they have lower expression of S1P receptor S1PR1, homing receptor to lymph node CD62L, activation marker KLRG1, KLF2 and CCR7 than T_{EM} in the blood.
- Other T_{RM}: The majority of T_{RM} express CD69 and CD103 markers. However, T_{RM} without CD103 expression can be found in intestines, secondary lymphoid organs and liver. Moreover, T_{RM} without both markers, CD69 and CD103, were found in substantial proportion in pancreas, salivary glands and female reproductive tract of mice.

== Development ==
T_{RM} cells develop from circulating effector memory T cell precursors in response to antigen. The main role in formation of T_{RM} cells has CD103 and expression of this integrin is dependent on the cytokine TGF-β. CD8^{+} effector T cells that lack TGF-β fail to upregulate CD103, and subsequently do not differentiate into T_{RM} cells. The important role in development of T_{RM} cells have various cytokines that support T_{RM} cell formation and survival. For example, homeostatic cytokine IL-15, pro-inflammatory cytokines such as IL-12 and IL-18, and barrier cytokines such as IL-33. Also, generation of CD103^{+} T_{RM} cells requires low expression of Eomes and T-bet transcription factors.

Shortly after antigen-specific response in the non-lymphoid tissue, infected tissue is occupied by CD8^{+} effector-stage T cells (T_{EFF}). These cells present early in the tissue have higher expression of some genes typical for T_{RM} and at the peak of the T cell response, local T cell population expresses more than 90% of the T_{RM} gene signature. This shows that differentiation process of T_{RM} cells starts early during immune response.

== Function ==
T_{RM} cells reside in many tissues that create barriers against outside environment and thus provide defense against repeatedly incoming pathogens. In the skin, lung, brain, and vagina T_{RM} cells are required to provide immediate rapid control of re-infection. CD4^{+} T_{RM} cells provide better protection against repeated infection with influenza in comparison with circulating memory CD4^{+} T cells. Moreover, CD8^{+} T_{RM} cells also play role in the protection against malignancies. T_{RM} cells express granzyme B which helps limit the spread of pathogens at the site of infection. Also, phenotypic and functional diversity is not only in T_{RM} from different tissues, but it could be found in various T_{RM} subsets within the same tissue. For example, CD49a distinguishes CD8^{+} T_{RM} subsets with different functions. T_{RM} cells positive for this marker produce perforin and IFNγ. On the other side, T_{RM} without CD49a expression produce IL-17. IFNγ production depends on the localization of T_{RM} in the tissue niche. CD8^{+} T_{RM} in mouse airways produce significant IFNγ in comparison to parenchymal CD8^{+} T_{RM} cells. After reactivation, T_{RM} cells undergo rapid proliferation in situ. Increase in T_{RM} numbers after repeated exposure to antigens is not derived just from existing T_{RM}, but circulating T cells contribute to the generation and higher numbers of TRM, too. Also, not every T_{RM} express CD69 and CD103 what support phenotypic heterogeneity of T_{RM} cells. T_{RM} cells are able to activate innate and adaptive leukocytes to protect the host. Cooperation of T_{RM} cells with other memory T cell populations provide tissue surveillance and clearance of the infections.

== Potential of CD8^{+} T_{RM} cells in cancer immunotherapy ==
Cytotoxic CD8^{+} T lymphocytes are able to recognize malignant cells. Production of neoantigens by tumour cells can lead to peptides which are presented to CD8^{+} T cells bound to MHC I. After antigen recognition, CD8^{+} T cells destroy tumor cells using IFN-γ, TNF-α, granzyme B and perforin. However, malignant cells can avoid this elimination by various mechanisms such as the loss of MHC I molecule, induction of anti-inflammatory tumor micro-environment, inhibition of T cell function, upregulation of ligands whose interactions with CD8^{+} T cell receptors results in their suppression etc. Immune checkpoint therapy and tumor-infiltrating lymphocytes (TIL) therapy are cancer immunotherapy strategies whose principle lies in suppression of tumor cell inhibitory pathways or in introduction of expanded CD8^{+} T cells. Whereas large fraction of TILs are T_{RM} cells, they are candidates for solid cancer immunotherapy.

T_{RM} cells infiltrated in tumors have protective role and are associated with good clinical results in various cancer types, but not in pancreatic cancer. They have decreased expression of IFN-γ, TNF-α and IL-2 in comparison with circulating T cells in melanoma patients what suggest different mechanism for tumor growth control. Upregulation of granzyme A and granzyme B was found in T_{RM} cells in lung carcinoma patients. However, in T_{RM} cells are also upregulated immune checkpoint receptors. This suggests, that most of the tumor T_{RM} show an exhausted phenotype which may be saved by immune checkpoint inhibitor therapies. Nonidentical tumors may contain different T_{RM} populations.

== Role in disease pathogenesis ==
Autoreactive T_{RM} cells and reduced ratio or activity of regulatory T cells (Tregs) which protects body from autoimmunity by securing self-tolerance may induce autoimmune diseases such as vitiligo, cutaneous lupus erythematosus, psoriasis, alopecia areata, cicatricial alopecia,multiple sclerosis, lupus nephritis, rheumatoid arthritis and autoimmune hepatitis.

=== Vitiligo ===
Vitiligo is an autoimmune skin disease with white spots phenotype. CD8^{+} T lymphocytes destroy melanocytes in some parts of the skin what manifest like white spots on the skin. Multiple genes as well as environment play role in developing vitiligo and migration of CD8^{+} T cells correlates with the state of disease. 80% of autoreactive CD8^{+} T cells which are specific towards melanocyte self-antigens express CD69 or CD69 and CD103 T_{RM} markers. There is also higher number of CD49a^{+} CD8^{+} CD103^{+} T cells with cytotoxic potential in epiderma and derma of the vitiligo patients in comparison with healthy skin. Treatment of vitiligo lies in inhibition of JAK/STAT signaling pathway using JAK inhibitors. T_{RM} cells have reduced IFNγ production and white spots on skin disappear. However, the treatment can not be stopped, because white spots will appear again.

=== Cutaneous lupus erythematosus (CLE) ===
CLE is another autoimmune skin disease with several subtypes. Common feature is interface dermatitis or inflammation at the dermal-epidermal junction. Again, contribution of genetic and environment factors lead to the development of CLE. It is not really clear what is the specificity of the T cell causing CLE in the skin, but some studies showed T cells reactive to nucleosomes/histones. Except aberrant T cell signaling which conduces to the pathogenesis of CLE, increased presence of T_{RM} was also found in the skin of CLE patients refractory to antimalarials. Treatment lies in JAK/STAT inhibitors, but can not be stopped, because skin lessions will appear again.
