= Virtual memory T cell =

Virtual memory T cells (T_{VM}) are a subtype of T lymphocytes. These are cells that have a memory phenotype but have not been exposed to a foreign antigen. They are classified as memory cells but do not have an obvious memory function. They were first observed and described in 2009. The name comes from a computerized "virtual memory" that describes a working memory based on an alternative use of an existing space.

== Origin ==
T_{VM} arise from autoreactive T cells during the thymus section. Autoreactive lymphocytes are commonly removed in the thymus because they recognize the body's own structure and could induce autoimmune disease. However, some autoreactive CD8+ T cells are intended for development into T_{VM}. This process is controlled by CD8-Lck. The generation and maintenance of the TVM population depends on the transcription factors Eomes and IRF4, type I interfering signaling. The presence of the IL-15 cytokine is then essential.

== Function ==
The existence of memory T cells is also known in non-immunized animals. T_{VM} are cells specific and reactive to foreign antigens that have never met. There are different phenotypic mismatches between naive, true memory and T_{VM}. We can find functional differences after activation. It is easy to distinguish naive cells from memory, but true memory from T_{VM} can only be distinguished by CD49d and CD122 markers.

T_{VM} produce a stronger inflammatory response using IL-12 and IL-18 cytokines than naive T cells. They are a significant producer of IFN-γ. Compared to other naive phenotypes, T_{VM} represents only 10—30% of the population, but outperforms other types of subpopulation with its stronger proliferation. However, the reaction is slower than true memory cells. These properties suggest that virtual memory T cells may participate in both innate and adaptive immune responses during the immune response.

Another indispensable feature is the suppression of potential states. This occurs already in the development of virtual memory cells from autoreactive T cell clones. For this reason, some scientists thought that TVM could be used in the fight against autoimmunity, but so far no evidence has been found.

The physiological role of virtual memory T lymphocytes has yet to be investigated, but research suggests that they have a unique type of response to pathogens and contribute to the functional diversity of the T cell immune system, which is required for effective immune defense.

== CD4 positive T_{VM} ==
Previous paragraphs dealt with only CD8+ T lymphocytes, but CD4+ virtual memory T cells are also described. The function of these cells is not known, but an even more likely relationship to autoimmune conditions is assumed, whether in their suppression or formation.
