= Carotegrast methyl =

Chemical compound

Clinical data
- Trade names: Carogra
- Other names: AJM 300

Legal status
- Legal status: Rx in Japan

Identifiers
- IUPAC name: methyl (2S)-2-[(2,6-dichlorobenzoyl)amino]-3-[4-[6-(dimethylamino)-1-methyl-2,4-dioxoquinazolin-3-yl]phenyl]propanoate
- CAS Number: 401905-67-7
- PubChem CID: 9872780
- IUPHAR/BPS: 10510
- DrugBank: DB16119
- ChemSpider: 8048469
- UNII: OYK17DYO9M
- KEGG: D09799
- CompTox Dashboard (EPA): DTXSID60193189

Chemical and physical data
- Formula: C_{28}H_{26}Cl_{2}N_{4}O_{5}
- Molar mass: 569.44 g·mol^{−1}

Carotegrast methyl (trade name Carogra) is a drug used for the treatment of ulcerative colitis.

Carotegrast methyl is a prodrug that has little pharmacological activity itself. The methyl ester, which is designed to enhance oral bioavailability, is hydrolyzed to a carboxylic acid, carotegrast, by the enzyme carboxylesterase 1 in the liver. Carotegrast is an α4-integrin antagonist which prevents the chronic inflammation affecting the gastrointestinal tract in individuals with ulcerative colitis.

Chemical structure of the active metabolite carotegrast

Carotegrast methyl received approval in Japan in March 2022 for the treatment of moderate ulcerative colitis in patients who had inadequate response to mesalazine.
