= Integrin beta 7 =

ITGB7
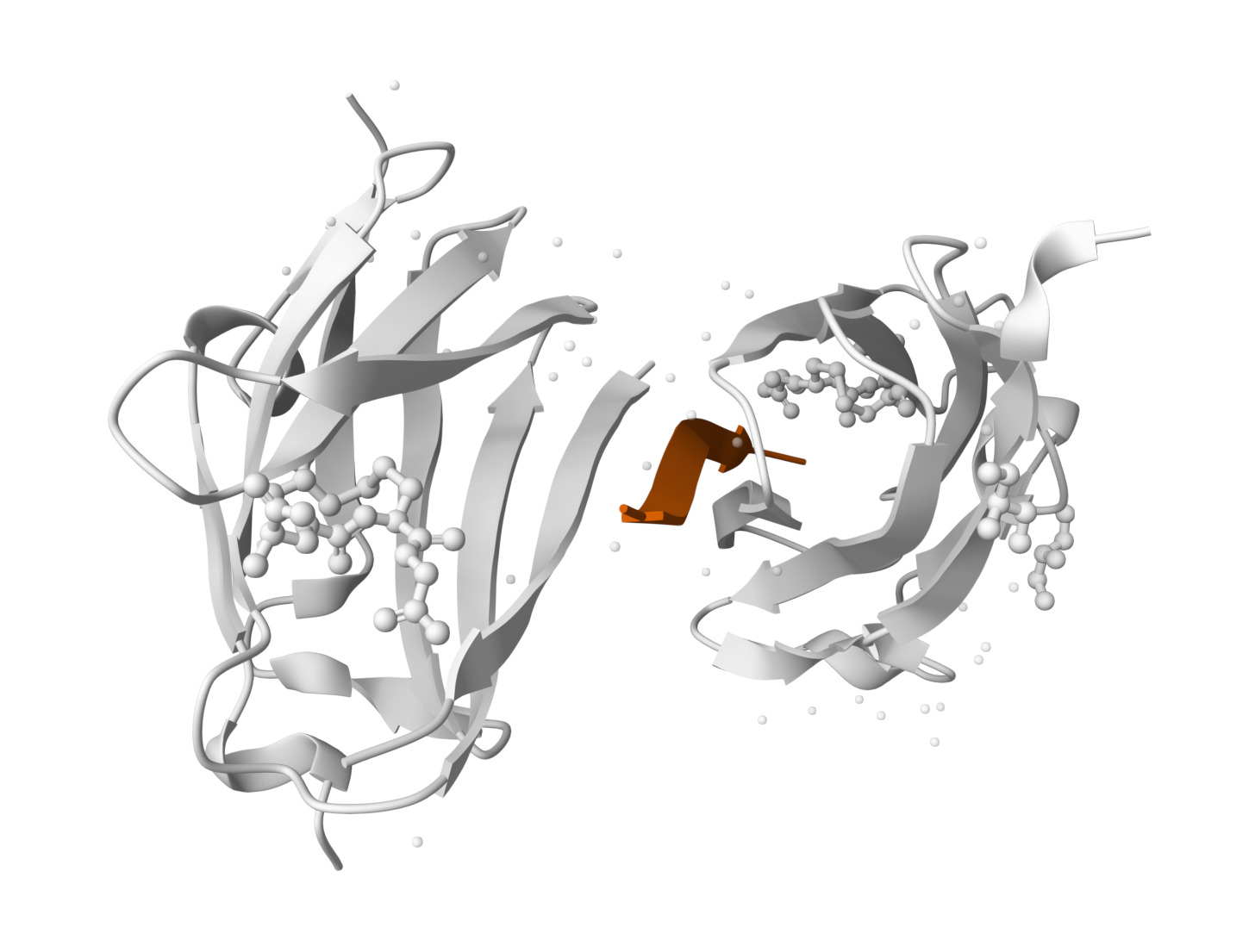

Identifiers
- Aliases: ITGB7, integrin subunit beta 7
- External IDs: OMIM: 147559; MGI: 96616; GeneCards: ITGB7
Available structures
PDB	Ortholog search: PDBe RCSB
PDB	List of PDB id codes 2BRQ, 3V4P, 3V4V

Gene location (Human)
Chr.	Chromosome 12 (human)
Band	12q13.13	Start	53,191,323 bp
Band	12q13.13	End	53,207,282 bp

Gene location (Mouse)
Chr.	Chromosome 15 (mouse)
Band	15 F2|15 57.39 cM	Start	102,124,430 bp
Band	15 F2|15 57.39 cM	End	102,140,379 bp
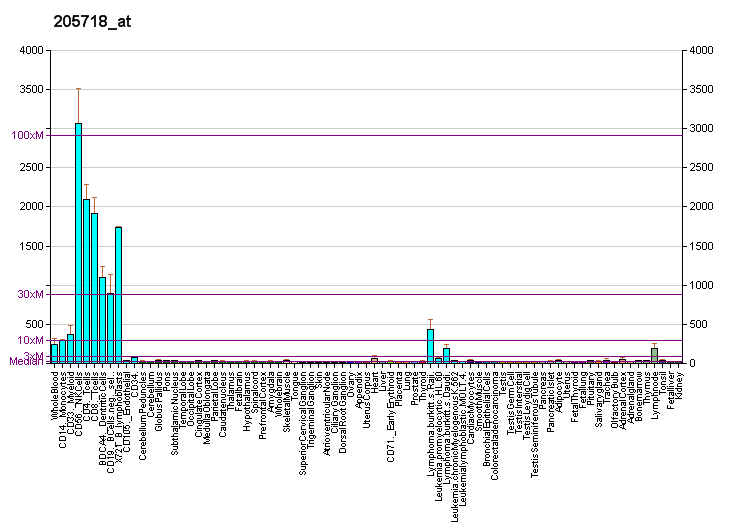
RNA expression pattern
Bgee	Human / Mouse (ortholog); Top expressed in: granulocyte; lymph node; bone marrow cell; blood; spleen; cecum; appendix; mononuclear cell; monocyte; trachea / Top expressed in: blood; mesenteric lymph nodes; granulocyte; spleen; thymus; morula; morula; corneal stroma; bone marrow; subcutaneous adipose tissue; More reference expression data
BioGPS	More reference expression data
Gene ontology
Molecular function	virus receptor activity; metal ion binding; protein binding; cell adhesion molecule binding; integrin binding; signaling receptor activity
Cellular component	integral component of membrane; membrane; receptor complex; plasma membrane; cell surface; integrin complex; extracellular exosome; integrin alpha4-beta7 complex; focal adhesion
Biological process	T cell migration; heterotypic cell-cell adhesion; cell-matrix adhesion involved in ameboidal cell migration; extracellular matrix organization; receptor clustering; cell adhesion; regulation of immune response; leukocyte tethering or rolling; integrin-mediated signaling pathway; viral entry into host cell; substrate adhesion-dependent cell spreading; cell-matrix adhesion; leukocyte migration; cell migration; cell adhesion mediated by integrin
Sources:Amigo / QuickGO
Orthologs
Databases	NCBI: entry; OMA: entry
Species	Human	Mouse
Entrez	3695	16421
Ensembl	ENSG00000139626	ENSMUSG00000001281
UniProt	P26010	P26011
RefSeq (mRNA)	NM_000889	NM_013566
RefSeq (protein)	NP_000880	NP_038594
Location (UCSC)	Chr 12: 53.19 – 53.21 Mb	Chr 15: 102.12 – 102.14 Mb
PubMed search
- Wikidata
View/Edit Human	View/Edit Mouse

Integrin beta-7 is an integrin protein that in humans is encoded by the ITGB7 gene. It can pair with ITGA4 (CD49d) to form the heterodimeric integrin receptor α_{4}β_{7}, or with ITGAE (CD103) to form α_{E}β_{7}.

== Structure ==
Like all integrin subunits, β_{7} is a highly flexible, membrane-bound, extracellular protein that must pair with an α subunit for stability. The molecule's flexibility allows it to dynamically regulate its affinity for ligand through conformational changes. Beginning with the apical end of the protein, farthest from the cell membrane, the β_{7} is composed of a head and upper legs, collectively known as the headpiece, lower legs, a transmembrane domain and a cytoplasmic tail. The top of the head is the I-like domain, sometimes called the βI domain, which, in combination with the α subunit, binds ligand. Just below this is the hybrid domain, a portion of which is N-terminal to the I-like domain. Below the hybrid domain is the PSI domain, which completes the headpiece. The lower legs consist of EGF domains 1-4 and the β tail domain. Finally there is a transmembrane domain, and the C-terminal cytoplasmic tail.

== Interactions ==
ITGB7 has been shown to interact with EED.
