= Integrin alpha E =

Protein-coding gene in the species Homo sapiens

ITGAE

Identifiers
- Aliases: ITGAE, CD103, HUMINAE, integrin subunit alpha E
- External IDs: OMIM: 604682; MGI: 1298377; GeneCards: ITGAE

Gene location (Human)
Chr.	Chromosome 17 (human)
Band	17p13.2	Start	3,714,628 bp
Band	17p13.2	End	3,801,188 bp

Gene location (Mouse)
Chr.	Chromosome 11 (mouse)
Band	11 B4|11 45.22 cM	Start	72,981,409 bp
Band	11 B4|11 45.22 cM	End	73,038,272 bp
RNA expression pattern
Bgee	Human / Mouse (ortholog); Top expressed in: oocyte; secondary oocyte; glutes; muscle of arm; biceps brachii; putamen; triceps brachii muscle; caudate nucleus; monocyte; lymph node / Top expressed in: seminiferous tubule; spermatid; spermatocyte; mesenteric lymph nodes; Paneth cell; lumbar subsegment of spinal cord; blood; jejunum; thymus; duodenum; More reference expression data
BioGPS	n/a
Gene ontology
Molecular function	metal ion binding
Cellular component	integral component of membrane; integrin complex; plasma membrane; external side of plasma membrane; membrane
Biological process	integrin-mediated signaling pathway; cell adhesion; extracellular matrix organization
Sources:Amigo / QuickGO
Orthologs
Databases	NCBI: entry; OMA: entry
Species	Human	Mouse
Entrez	3682	16407
Ensembl	ENSG00000083457	ENSMUSG00000005947
UniProt	P38570	Q60677
RefSeq (mRNA)	NM_002208	NM_008399; NM_172944; NM_001361245
RefSeq (protein)	NP_002199	NP_032425; NP_001348174
Location (UCSC)	Chr 17: 3.71 – 3.8 Mb	Chr 11: 72.98 – 73.04 Mb
PubMed search
- Wikidata
View/Edit Human	View/Edit Mouse

Integrin, alpha E (ITGAE) also known as CD103 (cluster of differentiation 103) is an integrin protein that in human is encoded by the ITGAE gene. CD103 binds integrin beta 7 (β7– ITGB7) to form the complete heterodimeric integrin molecule αEβ7, which has no distinct name. The αEβ7 complex is often referred to as "CD103" though this strictly refers only to the αE chain. Note that the β7 subunit can bind with other integrin α chains, such as α4 (CD49d).

== Tissue distribution ==
CD103 is expressed widely on intraepithelial lymphocyte (IEL) T cells (both αβ T cells and γδ T cells) and on some peripheral regulatory T cells (Tregs). It has also been reported on lamina propria T cells. A subset of dendritic cells in the gut mucosa and mesenteric lymph nodes, known as CD103 dendritic cells, also expresses this marker.

It is useful in identifying hairy cell leukemia which is positive for this marker in contrast to most other hematologic malignancies which are negative for CD103 except for hairy cell leukemia variant, a fraction of splenic marginal zone lymphomas, and enteropathy-associated T cell lymphoma.

== Function ==
The chief ligand for αEβ7 is E-cadherin, a cellular adhesion molecule (CAM) found on epithelial cells. It is probably important for T cell homing to the intestinal sites and thymocyte contacts with thymic reticuloepithelial cells.

Tregs are important for decreasing the immune response and appear to play a crucial role in the prevention of autoimmune diseases. Tregs are defined as CD4^{+}/CD25^{+}/Foxp3^{+} cells. Some CD4^{+}/FoxP3^{−} cells also express CD103 and have been attributed regulatory activity. It is unclear whether the presence of CD103 on Treg cells represents a specialized feature for Treg, or Treg differentiation of IEL T cells.

== See also ==
- Cluster of differentiation
- Tissue-resident memory T cell
