= Polycomb protein EED =

Protein-coding gene in the species Homo sapiens

EED
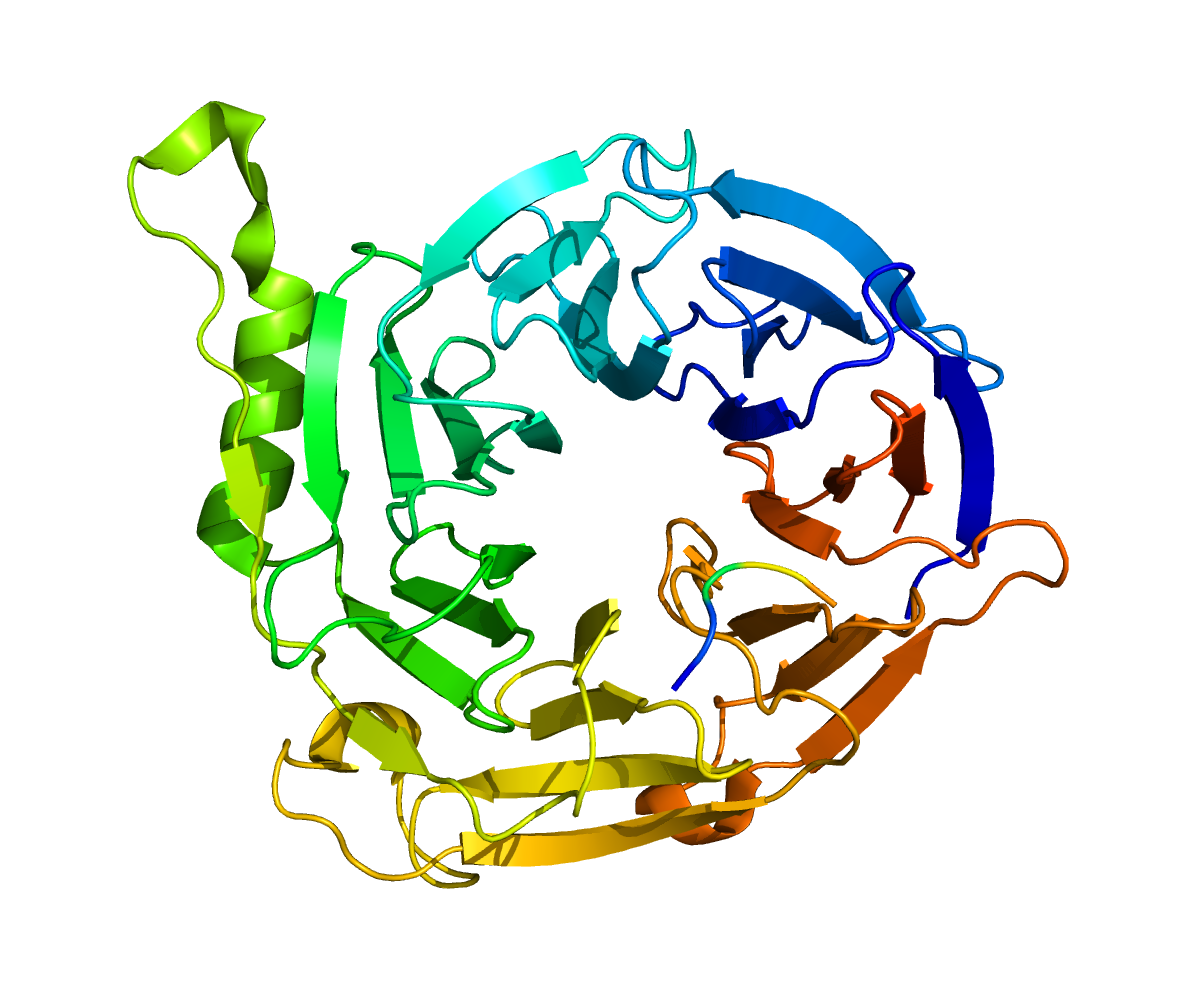

Identifiers
- Aliases: EED, HWAIT1, embryonic ectoderm development, COGIS
- External IDs: OMIM: 605984; MGI: 95286; GeneCards: EED
Available structures
PDB	Ortholog search: PDBe RCSB
PDB	List of PDB id codes 3IIW, 3IIY, 3IJ0, 3IJ1, 3IJC, 3JPX, 3JZG, 3JZH, 3JZN, 3K26, 3K27, 4X3E, 5IJ7, 5IJ8, 5HYN

Gene location (Human)
Chr.	Chromosome 11 (human)
Band	11q14.2	Start	86,244,753 bp
Band	11q14.2	End	86,278,813 bp

Gene location (Mouse)
Chr.	Chromosome 7 (mouse)
Band	7 D3|7	Start	89,603,862 bp
Band	7 D3|7	End	89,630,191 bp
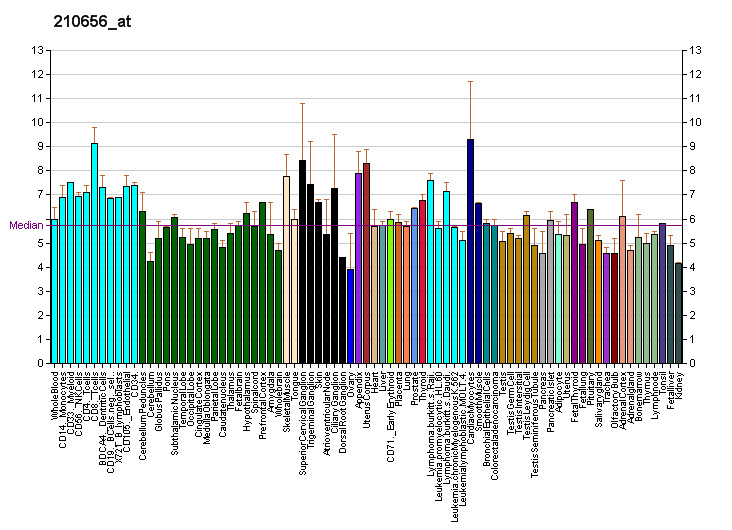

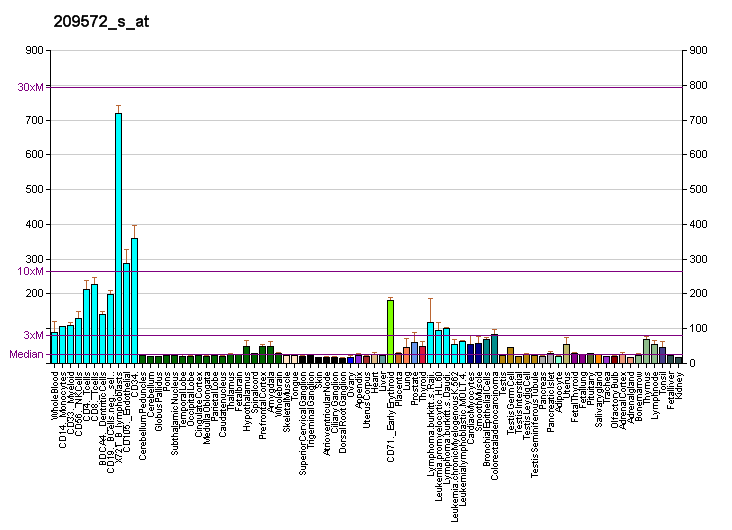
RNA expression pattern
Bgee	Human / Mouse (ortholog); Top expressed in: lymph node; cerebellar vermis; cerebellar hemisphere; canal of the cervix; right uterine tube; epithelium of bronchus; mucosa of transverse colon; right hemisphere of cerebellum; left ovary; ventricular zone / Top expressed in: zygote; primary oocyte; secondary oocyte; yolk sac; primitive streak; morula; morula; medullary collecting duct; Gonadal ridge; ureter; More reference expression data
BioGPS	More reference expression data
Gene ontology
Molecular function	chromatin binding; protein binding; identical protein binding; RNA polymerase II cis-regulatory region sequence-specific DNA binding; histone methyltransferase activity; histone methyltransferase activity (H3-K27 specific); nucleosome binding
Cellular component	sex chromatin; ESC/E(Z) complex; chromosome; pronucleus; nucleus; nucleoplasm; cytosol
Biological process	regulation of gene expression by genetic imprinting; regulation of transcription, DNA-templated; negative regulation of transcription by RNA polymerase II; transcription, DNA-templated; negative regulation of gene expression, epigenetic; spinal cord development; positive regulation of histone H3-K27 methylation; histone methylation; negative regulation of transcription, DNA-templated; regulation of adaxial/abaxial pattern formation; histone H3-K27 methylation; cellular response to leukemia inhibitory factor; negative regulation of G0 to G1 transition; chromatin organization
Sources:Amigo / QuickGO
Orthologs
Databases	NCBI: entry; OMA: entry
Species	Human	Mouse
Entrez	8726	13626
Ensembl	ENSG00000074266	ENSMUSG00000030619
UniProt	O75530	Q921E6
RefSeq (mRNA)	NM_001308007; NM_003797; NM_152991; NM_001330334	NM_021876
RefSeq (protein)	NP_001294936; NP_001317263; NP_003788	NP_068676
Location (UCSC)	Chr 11: 86.24 – 86.28 Mb	Chr 7: 89.6 – 89.63 Mb
PubMed search
- Wikidata
View/Edit Human	View/Edit Mouse

Polycomb protein EED is a protein that in humans is encoded by the EED gene.

== Function ==
Polycomb protein EED is a member of the Polycomb-group (PcG) family. PcG family members form multimeric protein complexes, which are involved in maintaining the transcriptional repressive state of genes over successive cell generations. This protein interacts with enhancer of zeste 2, the cytoplasmic tail of integrin β7, immunodeficiency virus type 1 (HIV-1) MA protein, and histone deacetylase proteins. This protein mediates repression of gene activity through histone deacetylation, and may act as a specific regulator of integrin function. Two transcript variants encoding distinct isoforms have been identified for this gene.

== Clinical significance ==
In humans, a de-novo mutation in EED has been reported in an individual displaying symptoms similar to those of Weaver syndrome.

== Interactions ==
EED has been shown to interact with:

- EZH2,
- HDAC1,
- Histone deacetylase 2,
- ITGB7,
- PPP1R8, and
- TGS1.
