= Interleukin 27 =

Protein in immune system

Interleukin 27 (IL-27) is a member of the IL-12 cytokine family. It is a heterodimeric cytokine that is encoded by two distinct genes, Epstein-Barr virus-induced gene 3 (EBI3) and Interleukin-27 subunit alpha (encoded by the gene IL27). IL-27 is expressed by antigen presenting cells and interacts with a specific cell-surface receptor complex known as IL-27 receptor (IL-27R). This receptor consists of two proteins, IL-27Rɑ and gp130. IL-27 induces differentiation of the diverse populations of T cells in the immune system and also upregulates IL-10.

== Signal transduction ==
When IL-27 binds to the IL-27 receptor, signaling pathways including JAK-STAT and p38 MAPK pathways are turned on. There are two types of responses, pro-inflammatory and anti-inflammatory, which involve different types of cells, such as macrophages, dendritic cells, T cells, and B cells. The response that is activated is very much dependent on the external surrounding of IL-27.

== Differentiation of T cells ==
There are many different subsets of T cells, such as Th1, Th2, Th17, Tr1, and Treg cells; IL-27 is greatly involved in differentiation through inducing or suppressing of each T cell subset. Th1 cells, which express IFNγ, are generated by IL-27 through STAT1 dimerization and nuclear localization which subsequently leads to the expression of T-bet and signature Th1 genes. Th2 cells, which express IL-4, are inhibited by IL-27 through the transcription factor GATA-3. Th17 cells, which express IL-17, IL-22, and granulocyte macrophage colony-stimulating factor (GM-CSF), are inhibited by IL-27 through STAT1 and expression of transcription factor RORγt. Tr1 cells, which express IL-10, are induced by IL-27 through the transcription factor c-Maf. Treg cells are inhibited by IL-27 through STAT1 and STAT3.

== IL-10 production ==
IL-10 acts in an anti-inflammatory manner by suppressing inflammatory responses. One way that IL-27 can have an anti-inflammatory response is through the expression of IL-10. IL-27 has been found to be involved in the production of IL-10 by stimulating the various subsets of T cells, especially Tr1 cells. Also involved are the STAT1 and STAT3 transcription factors that bind specifically to the receptor subunits, IL-27ɑ and glycoprotein. IL-27 is able to activate STAT3 signaling, which eventually leads to an increase of IL-10 secretion from Treg cells.
