= Naive T cell =

T cell which has not yet encountered its cognate antigen

In immunology, a naive T cell (T_{h}0 cell) is a T cell that has differentiated in the thymus, and successfully undergone the positive and negative processes of central selection in the thymus. Among these are the naive forms of helper T cells (CD4^{+}) and cytotoxic T cells (CD8^{+}). Naive T cells, unlike activated or memory T cells, have not encountered its cognate antigen within the periphery. After this encounter, the naive T cell is considered a mature T cell.

== Phenotype ==
Naive T cells are commonly characterized by the surface expression of L-selectin (CD62L) and C-C Chemokine receptor type 7 (CCR7); the absence of the activation markers CD25, CD44 or CD69; and the absence of memory CD45RO isoform. They also express functional IL-7 receptors, consisting of subunits IL-7 receptor-α, CD127, and common-γ chain, CD132. In the naive state, T cells are thought to require the common-gamma chain cytokines IL-7 and IL-15 for homeostatic survival mechanisms. While naive T cells are regularly regarded as a developmentally synchronized and fairly homogeneous and quiescent cell population, only differing in T cell receptor specificity, there is increasing evidence that naive T cells are actually heterogeneous in phenotype, function, dynamics and differentiation status, resulting in a whole spectrum of naive cells with different properties. For instance, some non-naive T cells express surface markers similar to naive T cells (Tscm, stem cell memory T cells; Tmp, memory T cells with a naive phenotype), some antigen-naive T cells have lost their naive phenotype, and some T cells are incorporated within the naive T cell phenotype but are a different T cell subset (Treg, regulatory T cells; RTE, Recent Thymic emigrant). The majority of human naive T cells are produced very early in life when the thymus is large and functional. The subsequent decrease in naive T cell production due to involution of the thymus with age is compensated by so called "peripheral proliferation" or "homeostatic proliferation" of naive T cells which have emigrated from the thymus earlier in life. Homeostatic proliferation causes change to naive T cell gene expression and is manifested by surface expression of CD25.

== Function ==
Naive T cells can respond to novel pathogens that the immune system has not yet encountered. Recognition by a naive T cell clone of its cognate antigen results in the initiation of an immune response. In turn, this results in the T cell acquiring an activated phenotype seen by the up-regulation of surface markers CD25^{+}, CD44^{+}, CD62L^{low}, CD69^{+} and may further differentiate into a memory T cell.

Having adequate numbers of naive T cells is essential for the immune system to continuously respond to unfamiliar pathogens.

== Mechanism of activation ==
When a recognized antigen binds to the T cell antigen receptor (TCR) located in the cell membrane of Th0 cells, these cells are activated through the following "classical" signal transduction cascade:

- the tyrosine kinase Lck which is associated with co-receptors CD4 and CD8: is engaged to phosphorylate the CD3 coreceptor complex and ζ-chains of the TCR and to recruit and activate the ζ-chain- associated protein Zap70
- activated Zap70 in turn phosphorylates the membrane adaptor Lat, which subsequently recruits several Src homology domain–containing proteins, including phospholipase C-γ1 (PLC-γ1)
- activation of PLC-γ1 results in the hydrolysis of phosphatidylinositol 4,5-bisphosphate to inositol 3,4,5-triphosphate and diacylglycerol
- inositol 3,4,5-triphosphate triggers release of Ca^{2+} from intracellular stores and diacylglycerol activates protein kinase C and RasGRP
- RasGRP in turn activates the mitogen-activated protein kinase cascade which

An alternative "non-classical" pathway involves activated Zap70 directly phosphorylating the p38 MAPK that in turn induces the expression of the vitamin D receptor (VDR). Furthermore, the expression of PLC-γ1 is dependent on VDR activated by calcitriol. Naive T cells have very low expression of VDR and PLC-γ1. However, activated TCR signaling through p38 upregulates VDR expression and calcitriol activated VDR, in turn, upregulates PLC-γ1 expression. Hence the activation of naive T cells is crucially dependent on adequate calcitriol levels.

In summary, activation of T cells first requires activation through the non-classical pathway to increase expression of VDR and PLC-γ1 before activation through the classical pathway can proceed. This provides a delayed response mechanism where the innate immune system is allowed time (~48 hrs) to clear an infection before the inflammatory T cell mediated adaptive immune response kicks in.

== See also ==
- Immune system
- Memory T cells
