= CD69 =

Human lectin protein

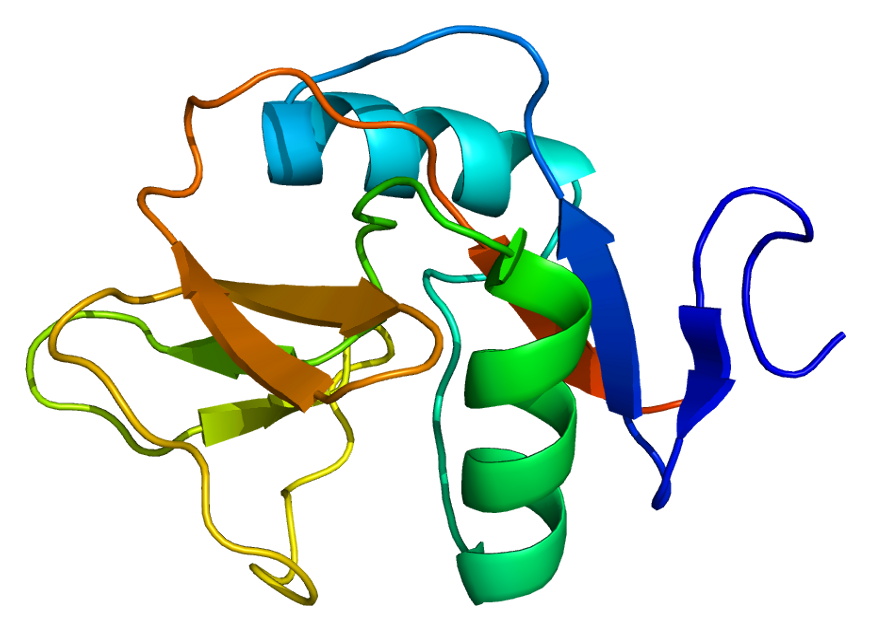

Identifiers
- Aliases: CD69, AIM, BL-AC/P26, CLEC2C, EA1, GP32/28, MLR-3, CD69 molecule
- External IDs: OMIM: 107273; MGI: 88343; GeneCards: CD69
Available structures
PDB	Ortholog search: PDBe RCSB
PDB	List of PDB id codes 1E87, 1E8I, 1FM5, 3CCK, 3HUP

Gene location (Human)
Chr.	Chromosome 12 (human)
Band	12p13.31	Start	9,752,486 bp
Band	12p13.31	End	9,760,901 bp

Gene location (Mouse)
Chr.	Chromosome 6 (mouse)
Band	6 F3|6 63.21 cM	Start	129,244,288 bp
Band	6 F3|6 63.21 cM	End	129,252,399 bp
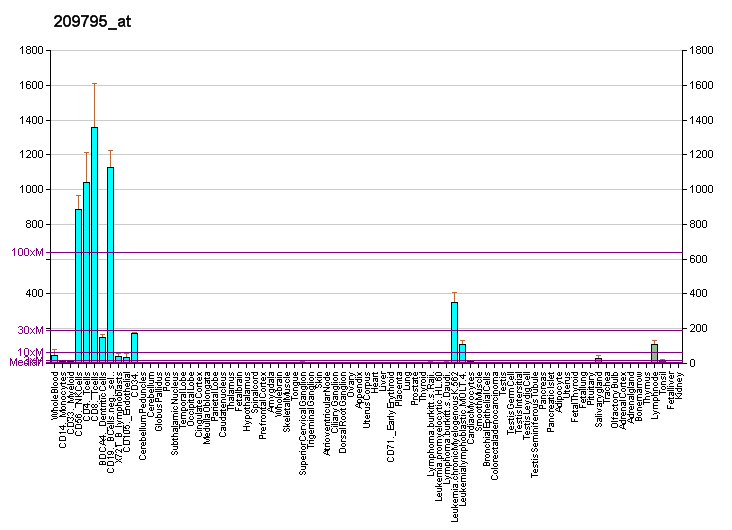
RNA expression pattern
Bgee	Human / Mouse (ortholog); Top expressed in: lymph node; appendix; spleen; gallbladder; rectum; bone marrow cell; granulocyte; epithelium of nasopharynx; right lung; epithelium of colon / Top expressed in: thymus; mesenteric lymph nodes; granulocyte; blood; spleen; primary oocyte; zygote; lumbar subsegment of spinal cord; secondary oocyte; bone marrow; More reference expression data
BioGPS	More reference expression data
Gene ontology
Molecular function	calcium ion binding; protein binding; transmembrane signaling receptor activity; carbohydrate binding; protein homodimerization activity
Cellular component	integral component of membrane; integral component of plasma membrane; membrane; external side of plasma membrane; protein-containing complex; cell surface
Biological process	signal transduction
Sources:Amigo / QuickGO
Orthologs
Databases	NCBI: entry; OMA: entry
Species	Human	Mouse
Entrez	969	12515
Ensembl	ENSG00000110848	ENSMUSG00000030156
UniProt	Q07108	P37217
RefSeq (mRNA)	NM_001781	NM_001033122
RefSeq (protein)	NP_001772	NP_001028294
Location (UCSC)	Chr 12: 9.75 – 9.76 Mb	Chr 6: 129.24 – 129.25 Mb
PubMed search
- Wikidata
View/Edit Human	View/Edit Mouse

CD69 (Cluster of Differentiation 69) is a human transmembrane C-type lectin protein encoded by the CD69 gene. It is an early activation marker that is expressed in hematopoietic stem cells, T cells, and many other cell types in the immune system. It is also implicated in T cell differentiation as well as lymphocyte retention in lymphoid organs.

== Structure ==
The gene encoding CD69 is located in the NK gene complex on chromosome 6 and chromosome 12 in mice and humans respectively. Activation signaling pathways in lymphocytes, NK cells, dendritic cells and other cell types upregulate transcription factors, such as NF-κB, ERG-1 (erythroblast transformation-specific related gene-1), and AP-1 (activator protein), in order to promote the transcription of the CD69 gene. The CD69 protein is subject to post-translational modifications. Namely, it is differentially glycosylated to produce either a 28 kDa peptide or a 32 kDa peptide. Two of these peptides randomly combine to form a homodimer linked by a disulfide bond. These subunits have a C-type lectin domain (CTLD) that binds ligands, a transmembrane domain, and a cytoplasmic tail that relays signals to the cell interior.

== Ligands ==
CD69 lacks the characteristic Ca^{2+} binding residues in CTLDs, indicating that it might bind to proteins rather than carbohydrates, the usual ligand of CTLDs. It has been shown that CD69 binds to Gal-1, a carbohydrate binding protein located on some dendritic cells and macrophages, in addition to Myl9/12. Other ligands have yet to be identified. However, it is known that binding of the ligands initiates the Jak/Stat signaling pathway as well as the mTOR/HIF1-α pathway. CD69 is also known to interact with and mediate S1P and LAT1 receptors, which influence lymphocyte egress in lymphoid organs among other responses. More work must be done to fully characterize CD69-ligand interactions as well as CD69's method of transducing intracellular signals.

== Function ==
The activation of T lymphocytes and natural killer (NK) cells, both in vivo and in vitro, induces expression of CD69. This molecule, which appears to be the earliest inducible cell surface glycoprotein acquired during lymphoid activation, is involved in lymphocyte proliferation and functions as a signal-transmitting receptor in lymphocytes, including natural killer (NK) cells, and platelets (Cambiaggi et al., 1992) [supplied by OMIM].

=== T cell differentiation ===
CD69 expression has been associated with both regulatory T cell (Treg), memory T cell and Bcl6^{lo} CD69^{hi} LZ GC B plasmablast precursors. Treg precursors exit the thymus expressing CD69 and complete differentiation into Treg cells in peripheral tissues when they encounter antigens and other cytokines, like IL-2. Through the JAK/STAT signaling pathway, CD69 activation also induces the production of TGF-β as well as IL-2, which contribute to the differentiation of Treg cells as mentioned above. Furthermore, CD69 is also known to be upregulated by NF-κB signaling at the onset of an immune response. A prolonged immune response is then maintained by the non-canonical NF-κB pathway, which in turn is associated with Treg differentiation.

In addition to Treg differentiation, CD69 is a common marker of precursor and mature resident memory T cells (TRMs) that are localized in peripheral tissues. TGF-β is also responsible for the development of TRMs, thus promoting TRM differentiation in a manner similar to Treg differentiation.

=== Lymphocyte migration ===
Most lymphocytes express sphingosine-1-phosphate receptors (S1P1-5), which are G protein-coupled receptors located in the cell membrane that bind to the ligand sphingosine-1-phosphate (S1P). S1P is a sphingolipid metabolite that is abundant in the bloodstream and, upon binding to S1PR1, promotes lymphocyte egress from lymphoid organs so they can travel to affected tissues. However, when a T cell is activated in a lymphoid organ through cytokine and TCR signaling, CD69 is expressed and forms a complex with S1PR1 (not S1PR3 or S1PR5). This association is dependent on the interaction between the CD69 transmembrane domain and helix-4 of S1PR1. Following formation of this complex, S1PR1 is internalized and is destroyed within the cell, inhibiting its ability to bind S1P and initiate downstream signaling. This in turn results in temporary lymphocyte retention in the lymph organs. It is thought that retention of lymphocytes in the lymph nodes may increase the chance of successful lymphocyte activation, especially if the initial activation signal was weak. Similarly, CD69 expressed in thymocytes following positive selection may ensure that T cells fully mature in the thymus prior to entering circulation.

Some research has shown that S1PR1 and CD69 co-regulate so that when CD69 is in greater abundance, it results in the removal of S1PR1 from the membrane as mentioned above. However, if S1PR1 is more abundant than CD69, as would be the case in mature T cells, CD69 membrane localization is reduced. In this manner, regulation of CD69 and S1PR1 expression and localization jointly impact lymphocyte egress and migration.

==== Vascular endothelial cells ====
CD69 is induced also in non-immune cells. For example, poly-I:C and LPS actiavtion of vascular endothelial cells induced CD69 protein, which induced downregulation of S1PR1. This led to vascular endothelial dysfunction and increased vascular leak. Overexpression of CD69 in lung endothelium of mice induced spontaneous vascular permeability. This mechanism appears to be functional during influenza viral infections, as shown in the H1N1 infection model in mice.

== See also ==
- Cluster of differentiation
