= Integrin alpha 4 =

Mammalian protein found in Homo sapiens

ITGA4

Identifiers
- Aliases: ITGA4, CD49D, IA4, integrin subunit alpha 4
- External IDs: OMIM: 192975; MGI: 96603; GeneCards: ITGA4
Available structures
PDB	Ortholog search: PDBe RCSB
PDB	List of PDB id codes 4HKC, 3V4P, 3V4V, 5FPI, 5C7Z

Gene location (Human)
Chr.	Chromosome 2 (human)
Band	2q31.3	Start	181,457,202 bp
Band	2q31.3	End	181,538,940 bp

Gene location (Mouse)
Chr.	Chromosome 2 (mouse)
Band	2 C3|2 47.38 cM	Start	79,085,770 bp
Band	2 C3|2 47.38 cM	End	79,163,467 bp
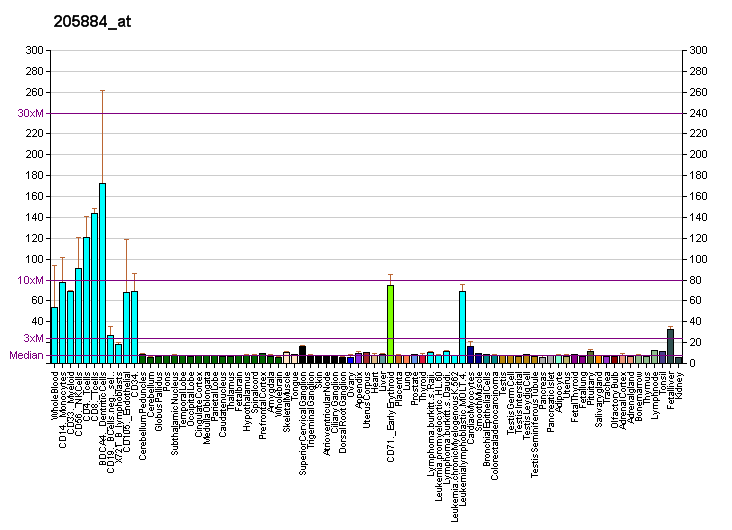

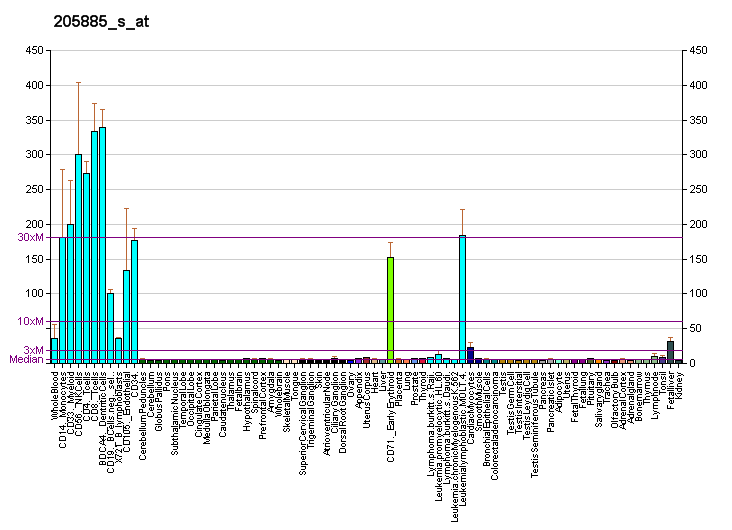
RNA expression pattern
Bgee	Human / Mouse (ortholog); Top expressed in: monocyte; bone marrow cell; granulocyte; appendix; blood; lymph node; spleen; trabecular bone; secondary oocyte; epithelium of colon / Top expressed in: blood; spleen; lumbar spinal ganglion; mesenteric lymph nodes; internal carotid artery; external carotid artery; muscle layer of urethra; thymus; granulocyte; human fetus; More reference expression data
BioGPS	More reference expression data
Gene ontology
Molecular function	protein binding; protein antigen binding; metal ion binding; antigen binding; fibronectin binding; cell adhesion molecule binding; coreceptor activity; C-X3-C chemokine binding; protein heterodimerization activity
Cellular component	extracellular exosome; integral component of membrane; membrane; focal adhesion; cell surface; integrin alpha4-beta7 complex; integrin complex; plasma membrane; growth cone; soma; protein-containing complex
Biological process	endodermal cell differentiation; B cell differentiation; positive regulation of T cell migration; extracellular matrix organization; heterotypic cell-cell adhesion; substrate adhesion-dependent cell spreading; cellular response to cytokine stimulus; cell-matrix adhesion involved in ameboidal cell migration; cell-matrix adhesion; leukocyte tethering or rolling; diapedesis; regulation of immune response; integrin-mediated signaling pathway; leukocyte migration; positive regulation of leukocyte tethering or rolling; positive regulation of leukocyte cell-cell adhesion; positive regulation of leukocyte migration; import into cell; leukocyte cell-cell adhesion; negative regulation of protein homodimerization activity; clathrin-dependent extracellular exosome endocytosis; cell adhesion; receptor clustering; cell-cell adhesion mediated by integrin; axonogenesis involved in innervation; cell-cell adhesion in response to extracellular stimulus; cellular response to amyloid-beta; positive regulation of vascular endothelial cell proliferation; neuron projection extension; positive regulation of endothelial cell apoptotic process
Sources:Amigo / QuickGO
Orthologs
Databases	NCBI: entry; OMA: entry
Species	Human	Mouse
Entrez	3676	16401
Ensembl	ENSG00000115232	ENSMUSG00000027009
UniProt	P13612	Q00651
RefSeq (mRNA)	NM_000885; NM_001316312	NM_010576
RefSeq (protein)	NP_000876; NP_001303241	NP_034706
Location (UCSC)	Chr 2: 181.46 – 181.54 Mb	Chr 2: 79.09 – 79.16 Mb
PubMed search
- Wikidata
View/Edit Human	View/Edit Mouse

CD49d is an integrin alpha subunit. It makes up half of the α4β1 lymphocyte homing receptor.

== Function ==
The product of this gene belongs to the integrin alpha chain family of proteins. Integrins are heterodimeric integral membrane proteins composed of an alpha chain and a beta chain. This gene encodes an alpha 4 chain. Unlike other integrin alpha chains, alpha 4 neither contains an I-domain, nor undergoes disulfide-linked cleavage. Alpha 4 chain associates with either beta 1 chain or beta 7 chain.

== Interactions ==
CD49d has been shown to interact with LGALS8 and Paxillin.

== See also ==
- Carotegrast methyl, an integrin alpha 4 antagonist used for the treatment of ulcerative colitis
