= Lymphocyte homing receptor =

Lymphocyte homing receptors are cell adhesion molecules expressed on lymphocyte cell membranes that recognize addressins on target tissues. Lymphocyte homing refers to adhesion of the circulating lymphocytes in blood to specialized endothelial cells within lymphoid organs. These diverse tissue-specific adhesion molecules on lymphocytes (homing receptors) and on endothelial cells (vascular addressins) contribute to the development of specialized immune responses.

Free lymphocytes constantly recirculate in blood after their re-entry from lymphoid tissue, via lymphatic and thoracic ducts. This happens so that the full repertoire of antigenic specificities of lymphocytes is continuously represented throughout the body. Homing happens in tissue-specific manner—e.g. B lymphocytes migrate better to mucosa-associated lymphoid tissue (Peyer's patches), and T lymphocytes preferentially to the peripheral lymph nodes.

The process of lymphocyte homing is deliberate, mediated by lymphocyte-endothelial recognition mechanisms that enable antigen-specific immune responses. Lymphocyte homing receptor control of organ-specific lymphocyte trafficking is thought to prevent autoreactivity in immune responses during B and T cell differentiation. Recently, lymphocyte homing has become a topic of interest for investigation of treatments for multiple sclerosis, type 1 diabetes mellitus, leukemia, and psoriasis.

== Homing mechanisms ==
=== Naive lymphocyte homing ===
Naive lymphocytes are able to circulate into secondary lymphoid tissues, Peyer’s patches, lymph nodes, and the spleen. Because they have not yet been exposed to antigen, these lymphocytes are undifferentiated and express few homing receptors.

High endothelial venules (HEVs) are cells found in secondary lymphoid organs that express large quantities of cell adhesion molecules, enabling undifferentiated lymphocytes to bind. After entering lymph nodes and Peyer’s patches via HEVs, naive T and B cells are exposed to antigen circulating in lymph and differentiate to contribute to the adaptive immune response. HEVs develop from cytokine production after exposure to antigen and express adhesion molecules from the selectin family, mucin-like family, and the Ig superfamily. Naive lymphocyte extravasation into Peyer’s patches is often mediated by L-selectin and limited expression of α4 integrins and other homing receptors prevents these lymphocytes from accessing mucosal effector tissue.

=== Mature lymphocyte homing ===
Mature lymphocytes are constantly recirculating in the blood and can traffic to secondary lymphoid tissue as well as target tissue including mucosal tissues of the lamina propria, inflammation, and other extralymphoid immune effector sites. Lymphocyte homing receptor expression is altered by antigen exposure. This function enables the adaptive immune system to specialize an immune response in different parts of the body.

Upon exposure to antigens, lymphocytes lack homing ability during a period of sessile differentiation and cell division, and antigen specific lymphocytes are stored in the spleen for 1–3 days. Subsequently, antigen-stimulated B and T cells express homing receptors particularly for the HEV in initial site of immunization tissue. Furthermore, lymphocytes can alter cell adhesion molecule “activatability” to increase binding ability. Organ-specific lymphocyte homing is important for antigen-specificity and in avoiding autoimmune cross-reactions.

=== Extravasation of lymphocytes ===
Lymphocyte homing occurs in four steps leading to extravasation into target tissue; Rolling, activation, activation-dependent “arrest”, and diapedesis. Mediated by lymphocyte receptors and vascular ligand interactions, “tethering” is a reversible linkage that leads to either rolling along the vessel wall or transient immediate arrest. L-selectin is able to mediate vessel adhesion whereas α4 integrins, α4β1 or α4β7, can perform primary or secondary adhesion through a stronger tethering and even contribute to transendothelial migration of lymphocytes. L-selectin, for example, is also able to be cleaved by an enzyme, ensuring proper binding of lymphocytes and allowing release of non-target cells. While attached to the vessel, lymphocytes test target tissue for chemokines and pro-adhesive factors that then prompt “arrest.” In addition to α4 integrins, LFA-1 and Mac-1 mediate the prevention of lymphocyte transendothelial migration into target tissues. While initial adhesion indicates the start of lymphocyte homing, there is regulation of each step of extravasation.

== Examples of lymphocyte homing receptors ==
α4β7 is an α4 integrin class homing receptor that targets lymphocytes in the gut expressing mucosal adhesion molecule-1(MAdCAM-1), mostly expressed in Peyer’s patches. Additionally, α4β1 with the ligand vascular adhesion molecule-1(VCAM-1) function in lymphocyte trafficking and inflammation.

Two other well known examples are CD34 and GLYCAM-1.

== See more ==
- B lymphocyte
- T lymphocyte
- Gut-specific homing
