= Gut-specific homing =

Gut-specific homing is the mechanism by which activated T cells and antibody-secreting cells (ASCs) are targeted to both inflamed and non-inflamed regions of the gut in order to provide an effective immune response. This process relies on the key interaction between the integrin α4β7 and the addressin MadCAM-1 on the surfaces of the appropriate cells. Additionally, this interaction is strengthened by the presence of CCR9, a chemokine receptor, which interacts with TECK. Vitamin A-derived retinoic acid regulates the expression of these cell surface proteins.

== T cell summary ==
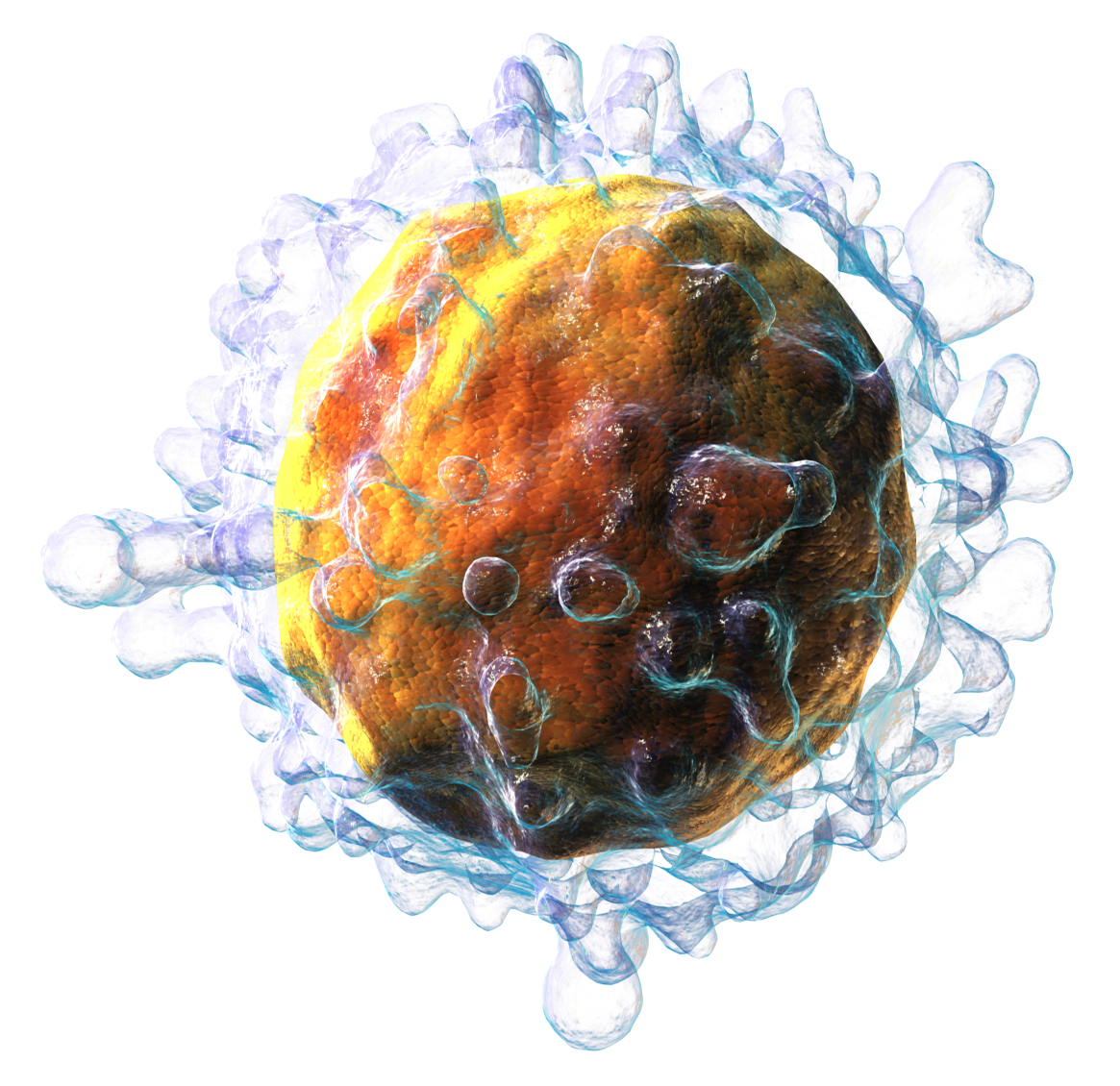
T cell image

T cells are produced in the thymus, and upon leaving they migrate to and around the lymphoid organs of the body, including lymph nodes. In the paracortex of the lymphoid nodes they are exposed to professional antigen-presenting cells (APCs), such as dendritic cells (DCs). Specific interactions between the naïve T cells and their cognate antigens result in T cell activation. The activated T cells, immunoblasts, undergo clonal expansion before acquiring effector functions. The activated T cells then emigrate from the lymph nodes, via the efferent lymphatic vessel, and migrate around the body in the blood.

In certain circumstances, some activated T cells show a preference for patrolling certain tissues. This has been termed lymphocyte homing. Gut-specific homing is the preferential movement of activated T cells to the intestine and the gut. In this way T cells are effectively recruited to form part of the first line of defense against pathogens. This is because T cells are targeted to and recirculated around primary infection sites. Overall this results in an extremely high concentration of lymphocytes in this region; 70% of the immunoglobulin-producing cells are found in the mucosal surfaces of the body.

== History ==
It was first suggested by Griselli that there were different pathways of T cell migration.

Initial theories that the T cells were targeted not to the tissue but to the antigens were disproved, as work by Cahill showed that purified T cells would relocate to the region of activation. For example, T cells activated in the Peyer's patch lymph nodes, found in the gut, would return to the gut. Subsequent work looked to explain the cause of this T cell targeting.

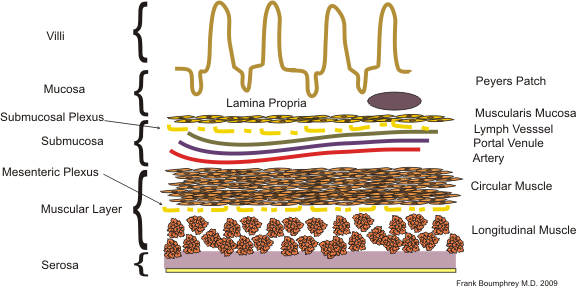
Diagram of the regions of the gut lymphocytes

Originally it was theorized that the micro-environment of lymphoid tissues provided the cues for the preferential homing of lymphocytes. While this may be the case to some extent, it is now widely held that the main driver in lymphocyte homing is the interactions between T cell adhesion molecules (lymphocyte homing receptors) and ligands (addressins) on the tissue high endothelial venules (HEVs). This theory arose from the observation that the cell surface integrins varied between different T cell populations. Work began to identify the differences and what they meant for T cell migration.

It became apparent that there were significantly higher levels of the integrin α4β7 on activated T cells in comparison to naïve T cells. Additionally, this integrin was much more common on CD8+ T cells activated in the Peyer's patches (PP T-cells) compared to other T cell subsets, such as peripheral and mesenteric lymph nodes activated T cells.

== Mechanism ==
The mechanism of gut specific homing is one largely based on interactions between receptors.

=== Rolling interaction ===
Lymphocytes migrate from the blood stream via a distinctive 'rolling interaction' mediated by interactions between cellular surface proteins. This 'rolling interaction' occurs in three stages:

1. Initial binding of a lymphocyte selectin and its ligand. This creates an unstable interaction where the lymphocyte is lightly held to the endothelium wall. The force of the lymph causes the cell to characteristically roll along the vessel. An example of this is the interaction between L-selectin and the PNAD (peripheral node addressin) ligand.
2. Arrest of the 'rolling' cell by activation step. Further interactions between proteins or activation via chemokines cause more stable forces to be formed between the cell and the vessel. The cell now is firmly attached to the vessel wall. Continuing the example the cell would be arrested by the interaction between ICAM and LFA-1 which are strengthened by chemokines.
3. Conformational change. Cellular activation causes a conformational change which results in the cell flattening against the vessel wall. Once flattened, the cell can undergo transendothelial migration.

=== Gut specific protein interactions ===
"Homing receptors" are crucial in forming in the interactions which allow lymphocyte movement.

=== Receptors involved ===
==== MadCAM-1 ====
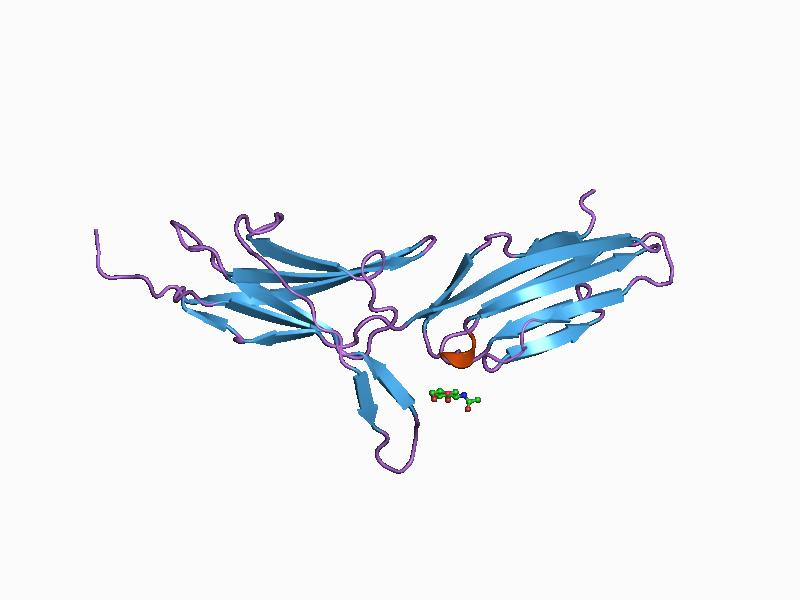
MadCam-1 receptor

MadCAM-1 expression is continuous in the high endothelial venules of Peyer's patches and in the micro-vessels of the intestinal tract. MadCAM-1 inhibitors prevent T cell migration to the gut.

Structural analysis of the MadCAM-1 protein shows that it is a 41.5 kDa transmembrane protein with a small cytoplasmic tail and a large extracellular region. This extracellular region includes three immunoglobin-like (Ig) domains. The last of which has 33% structural identity to the Ca_{2} domain of IgA-1. The first two of the domains are predicted to be the most important in the α4β7 interaction.

The MadCAM-1 protein has structural homology to the vascular surface receptors VCAM1 and ICAM at 28% and 32% respectively.

==== α4β7 integrin ====
α4β7 integrin is expressed on activated T cell imprinted for gut-specific homing. It is the counter receptor for the MadCAM-1 protein and the interactions of which cause the initial interaction step in 'rolling' cell model of lymphocyte migration

==== CCR9 ====
CCR9 receptors are presented on the T cells and are involved in forming a more stable interaction between the lymphocyte and the vessel wall. The ligand for CCR9 proteins is the CCL25 chemokine (which is otherwise known as TECK) protein. CCL25 is a chemokine which, upon binding to its receptor CCR9 on the lymphocyte, activates a conformational change in surface integrins on that lymphocyte, enabling high-affinity binding to the vessel wall and subsequent transmigration.

The CCL25 chemokine is prevalent in the epithelial tissue of the small intestine (7). It has been shown that CD8+ T cells activated in Peyer's patch lymph tissue display a tropism towards the CCL25 chemokine. The T cells migrate up a gradient towards CCL25.

==== Other cells ====
All GALT (gut-associated lymphoid tissue) DC, with an α chain CD103, are capable of producing gut-homing T cells. From this it has been suggested that dendritic cells are imprinted in some way before reaching the lymphoid organs in order to induce homing ability.

== Vitamin A regulation ==
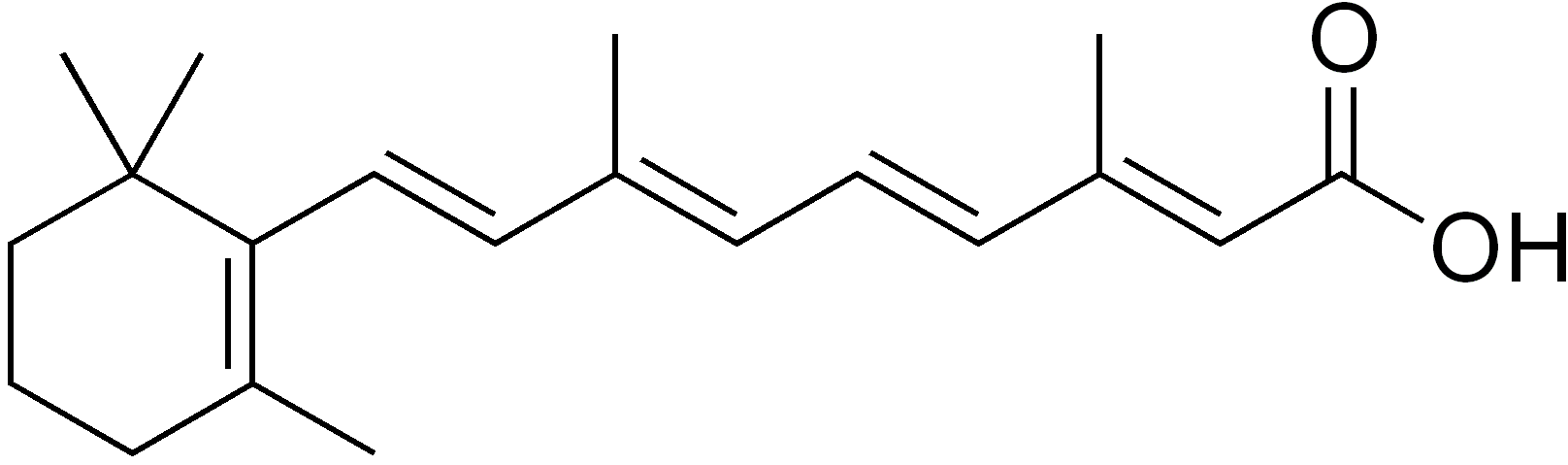
Retinoic acid

Vitamin A plays a fundamental part of the gut-specific homing response. Evidence shows that vitamin A is converted to retinoic acid (RA) by oxidation in the dendritic cells of the Peyers' patches. The presence of RA results in the expression of the key homing receptors, α4β7 and CCR9, on the cell surface of T cells potentially through transcriptional regulation.

=== Production of retinoic acid ===
Alcohol dehydrogenases (ADHs) and retinal dehydrogenase (RALDH) enzymes catalyse the oxidation of dietary vitamin A to retinoic acid. It is the presence of this retinoic acid which induces the expression of CCR9 and α4β7. Lower concentrations of retinoic acid, inside the cell, result in a decreased expression of the chemokine receptor CCR9 which in turn limits the ability of the cell to enter the gut mucosa. While the expression of α4β7 is also reduced under lower retinoic acid concentrations, it is predicted that the retinoic acid levels must be depleted to a greater extent to affect α4β7 expression compared to CCR9.

Western blot analysis showed dendritic cells from Peyers' patches produce both RALDH1 and ADH proteins. Additionally these have been found expressed in the epithelial cells of the small intestine. It therefore followed that these cells are capable of converting vitamin A into the major physiological form of RA: all-trans RA. Studies showing the DCs ability to catalyze the change of retinol to retinoic acid confirm this assumption.

Vitamin A oxidation

=== Effect on expression of receptors ===
Research on mice showed that the level of retinoic acid in the cells did have a significant effect on the expression of receptors on the cell surface. Mice models showed that even a 0.1 nM increase in the concentration of retinoic acid in cells increased the expression of α4. Furthermore, β7 expression was increased by raising the concentration of cellular retinoic acid. To ensure that increase in RA concentration was due to the catalytic enzymes ADH and RALDH, inhibitors of these enzymes were used. Citral, an inhibitor of the enzyme RALDH, suppressed the expression of α4β7 adhesins on the cell surface suggesting that the vitamin A → retinoic acid catalysis was important.

=== Homing ability ===
This, in theory, should increase the homing ability of the activated T cells to the gut. Evidence of this came from studies using RA-treated and vitamin A-deficient mice. In the mice with increased levels of RA there was a higher number of T cells found in the intestinal tissue. Research on vitamin A-deficient mice confirmed the reverse was true as there was significantly lower number of T cells found in the intestinal lamina propria compared to control mice. Contrastingly, there was no such decrease in T cell numbers in the lungs and liver of the deficient mice implying that the RA imprinting pathway is unique to gut-specific homing T cells.

=== Transcriptional regulation by retinoic acid ===
It has theorized that the RA levels affect the expression of the MadCAM-1 and α4β7 receptors by transcriptional regulation.

The RAR and RXR receptors, which are the nucleic receptors for RA, can form heterodimers given specific cellular conditions. In the dimer conformation, the receptors are able to bind RARE or RXRE sequences found in DNA. These genetic regions are often found in the 5' end of genes suggesting they play a regulatory role. In fact they are often found near the beginning or in introns of genes regulated in response to retinoid levels.

Sections of these RARE sequences, and additionally RA boxes, have been found in the first exons of the genes which encode b7 and the CCR9 receptors. Using antagonist proteins against RAR subunit showed a reduction in the expression of alpha.

Therefore, it may be that the expression of the alpha receptors are transcriptionally regulated by the concentration of RA in the cell.

=== Other effects of vitamin A on lymphocyte homing ===
Increased vitamin A concentrations was also shown to reduce the expression of the receptors P-Lig, E-Lig and Fuct-VII in vitro. This suggests that not only does vitamin A increase the ability of the T-cell to home to the gut it also simultaneously reduces the likelihood of the cell to bind to another tissue.

== Reasons for lymphocyte homing ==
The most convincing argument is that by targeting the lymphocytes to the region in which they were activated it is more likely that they will come into contact with their cognate antigen. They are targeted to the region where the pathogen's antigen is most likely to be found within the periphery. Additionally, it is possible that tissue type may have an effect on the phenotypic traits of T-cells both upon activation and migration thorough the tissue. It would therefore seem sensible for the T cells to exhibit signs of preferential tissue as they are likely to perform their protective role in an environment they are most suited to.

== Health concerns ==
An age-related decline in intestinal immune response is common in elderly people. This immunosenescence has been hypothesized to be due to impaired homing of lymphocytes to the Peyers' patches found in the gut.

This process is not unique to humans and is documented in other animals including rhesus macaques and rats. Research has shown older rats had reduced expression of the key gut-specific homing receptors α4β7; and MadCAM-1. These older rats had 30% less α4β7; and 17% less MadCAM-1 than juvenile rat equivalents.

Whilst no causative relationship has been proved to date, it is speculated that the reduced expression of the receptors is responsible for overall loss in immune response. Additionally post-translation modifications may weaken the affinity of the receptors for each other.

== Future work ==
Further work is needed to understand the conditions causing tissue-specific homing. The field offers great potential in medical therapeutics. It may become possible to target oral attenuated vaccines to the gut mucosa, potentially rendering the vaccine more effective. It may also improve the treatment of chronic bowel disease.

== Other tissue specific lymphocyte homing ==
Gut specific homing is the most understood of lymphocyte homing. However, there are many other examples which include:

- Lymphoid specific homing- Homing of naïve T cells to the lymph tissue around the body. The adhesin expressed by the naïve T cells is L-selectin (1). once the T cells are activated they repress the expression of L selectin to allow them to migrate freely around the body in the blood.
- Skin specific homing- Acts as a method of recruiting a large number of memory T cells to the skin, which poses a high risk of infection. Again this involves the expression of different integrins. In this case, in humans α4β1 and cutaneous lymphocyte antigen (CLA) are expressed on the T cell surface. These integrins interact with E-selectin molecules found on inflamed skin.
- Breast specific homing- Involved in the redirection of T-cells to the mammary glands. this occurs in order for protective lymphocytes to be included in the breast milk.
- B cell homing- There is limited knowledge of this as of late.
