= PNAd =

PNAd may refer to:

- Peripheral node addressin
- Pseudouridine N1-[(S)-2-amino-2-carboxyethyl]-N3-[(S)-2-amino-2-carboxyethyl]-adenosine, a modified nucleotide that can be found in the structure of transfer RNA (tRNA)
