= Firategrast =

Identifiers
- IUPAC name: (2S)-2-[(2,6-difluorobenzoyl)amino]-3-[4-[4-(ethoxymethyl)-2,6-dimethoxyphenyl]phenyl]propanoic acid
- CAS Number: 402567-16-2
- PubChem CID: 9935681
- IUPHAR/BPS: 11486
- DrugBank: DB12732
- ChemSpider: 8111309
- UNII: OJY3SK9H5F
- KEGG: D06590
- ChEMBL: ChEMBL2104967
- CompTox Dashboard (EPA): DTXSID00433031

Chemical and physical data
- Formula: C_{27}H_{27}F_{2}NO_{6}
- Molar mass: 499.511 g·mol^{−1}
- 3D model (JSmol): Interactive image
- SMILES: CCOCC1=CC(=C(C(=C1)OC)C2=CC=C(C=C2)C[C@@H](C(=O)O)NC(=O)C3=C(C=CC=C3F)F)OC
- InChI: InChI=1S/C27H27F2NO6/c1-4-36-15-17-13-22(34-2)24(23(14-17)35-3)18-10-8-16(9-11-18)12-21(27(32)33)30-26(31)25-19(28)6-5-7-20(25)29/h5-11,13-14,21H,4,12,15H2,1-3H3,(H,30,31)(H,32,33)/t21-/m0/s1; Key:YLFZHHDVRSYTKT-NRFANRHFSA-N

Firategrast (SB-683699) is an experimental drug which is an orally active and selective antagonist of the α4β1 and α4β7 integrin receptors. It reduces trafficking of lymphocytes into the central nervous system, and is in clinical trials for the treatment of multiple sclerosis. It may also have application in the treatment of breast cancer.
