= Emvistegrast =

Clinical data
- Other names: GS-1427

Identifiers
- IUPAC name: ethyl (2S)-2-[[2-fluoro-6-methyl-4-[(3R)-3-(trifluoromethyl)morpholin-4-yl]benzoyl]amino]-3-[8-(1-methyl-2,4-dioxopyrido[3,4-d]pyrimidin-3-yl)quinolin-5-yl]propanoate
- CAS Number: 2417307-56-1
- PubChem CID: 146614402
- IUPHAR/BPS: 14189
- UNII: HJ7JZ7YH2D

Chemical and physical data
- Formula: C_{35}H_{32}F_{4}N_{6}O_{6}
- Molar mass: 708.671 g·mol^{−1}
- 3D model (JSmol): Interactive image
- SMILES: CCOC(=O)[C@H](CC1=C2C=CC=NC2=C(C=C1)N3C(=O)C4=C(C=NC=C4)N(C3=O)C)NC(=O)C5=C(C=C(C=C5C)N6CCOC[C@@H]6C(F)(F)F)F
- InChI: InChI=InChI=1S/C35H32F4N6O6/c1-4-51-33(48)25(42-31(46)29-19(2)14-21(16-24(29)36)44-12-13-50-18-28(44)35(37,38)39)15-20-7-8-26(30-22(20)6-5-10-41-30)45-32(47)23-9-11-40-17-27(23)43(3)34(45)49/h5-11,14,16-17,25,28H,4,12-13,15,18H2,1-3H3,(H,42,46)/t25-,28+/m0/s1; Key:UQXAGOKYXPMBEP-LBNVMWSVSA-N

Emvistegrast is an investigational new drug that as of 2026 was being developed by Gilead Sciences for the treatment of ulcerative colitis. It is an integrin alpha4/beta7 antagonist.
