= Peripheral node addressin =

Peripheral node addressin, often referred to as PNAd, are glycoprotein ligands. More formally, the term includes "lymph" to specify the node: peripheral lymph node addressin.

PNAd is a critical component of the immune system, enabling the targeted migration of lymphocytes to the lymph nodes and facilitating an effective immune response. PNAd's role in lymphocyte homing is essential for the proper functioning of the immune system, as it ensures that lymphocytes can efficiently enter the lymph nodes to encounter and respond to foreign antigens, such as viruses and bacteria.

PNAd is a type of cell adhesion molecule found on the surface of high endothelial venules (HEVs) in lymph nodes. It plays a crucial role in the immune system by facilitating the migration of lymphocytes, a type of white blood cell, from the bloodstream to the lymph nodes where they participate in immune responses.

The process of lymphocyte migration from the bloodstream to the lymph nodes is called lymphocyte homing. PNAd plays a key role in this process by interacting with L-selectin, which is present on the surface of lymphocytes. The adhesion molecule L-selectin binds to sulfated carbohydrate ligands on high endothelial venules (HEV). The binding between PNAd and L-selectin allows lymphocytes to slow down and roll along the inner surface of HEVs. This rolling action enables lymphocytes to come into close contact with other molecules called chemokines, which trigger the firm adhesion and subsequent transmigration of lymphocytes across the endothelial cells and into the lymph node.
