= Addressin =

Protein found in humans

MADCAM1
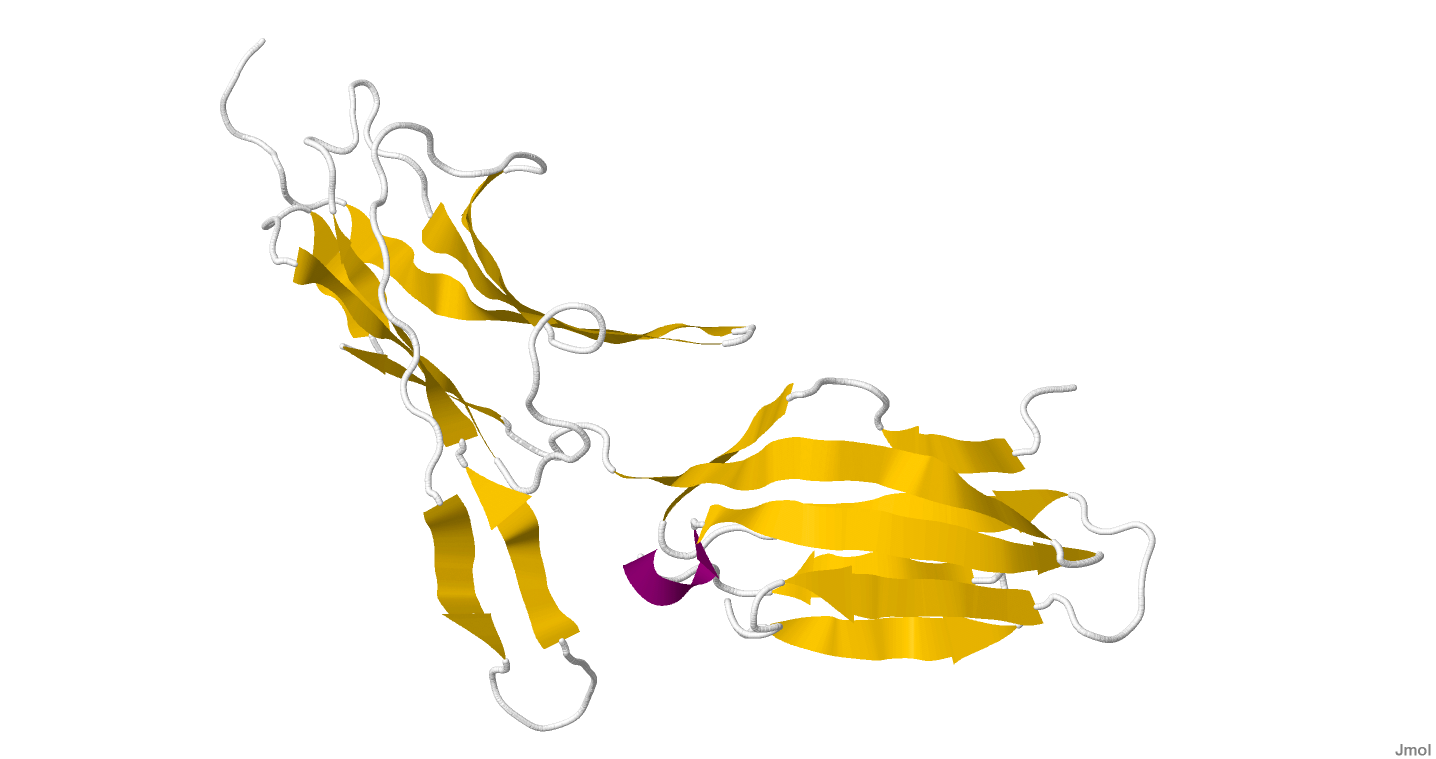

Identifiers
- Aliases: MADCAM1, MACAM1, mucosal vascular addressin cell adhesion molecule 1
- External IDs: OMIM: 102670; GeneCards: MADCAM1
Available structures
PDB	Human UniProt search: PDBe RCSB
PDB	List of PDB id codes 1BQS, 1GSM, 4HBQ, 4HC1, 4HCR, 4HD9

Gene location (Human)
Chr.	Chromosome 19 (human)
Band	19p13.3	Start	489,176 bp
Band	19p13.3	End	505,343 bp
RNA expression pattern
Bgee	Human / Mouse (ortholog); Top expressed in: gonad; appendix; mucosa of transverse colon; testicle; mucosa of sigmoid colon; mucosa of ileum; epithelium of colon; right hemisphere of cerebellum; right frontal lobe; spleen / n/a; More reference expression data
BioGPS	n/a
Gene ontology
Molecular function	integrin binding involved in cell-matrix adhesion
Cellular component	integral component of membrane; plasma membrane; membrane
Biological process	leukocyte tethering or rolling; heterotypic cell-cell adhesion; cell adhesion; cell-matrix adhesion; extracellular matrix organization; receptor clustering; immune response; signal transduction; regulation of immune response; positive regulation of leukocyte migration; integrin-mediated signaling pathway; positive regulation of lymphocyte migration
Sources:Amigo / QuickGO
Orthologs
Databases	NCBI: entry; OMA: entry
Species	Human	Mouse
Entrez	8174	n/a
Ensembl	ENSG00000099866	n/a
UniProt	Q13477	n/a
RefSeq (mRNA)	NM_130762; NM_130760	n/a
RefSeq (protein)	NP_570116; NP_570118	n/a
Location (UCSC)	Chr 19: 0.49 – 0.51 Mb	n/a
PubMed search		n/a
- Wikidata
View/Edit Human

Mucosal vascular addressin cell adhesion molecule 1 (MAdCAM-1) is a protein that in humans is encoded by the MADCAM1 gene. The protein encoded by this gene is an endothelial cell adhesion molecule that interacts preferentially with the leukocyte beta7 integrin LPAM-1 (alpha4 / beta7), L-selectin, and VLA-4 (alpha4 / beta1) on myeloid cells to direct leukocytes into mucosal and inflamed tissues. It is a member of the immunoglobulin superfamily and is similar to ICAM-1 and VCAM-1.

== Nomenclature ==
Addressin is a lesser-used term to describe the group of adhesion molecules that are involved with lymphocyte homing, commonly found at high-endothelial venules (HEVs) where lymphocytes exit the blood and enter the lymph node. Addressins are the ligands to the homing receptors of lymphocytes. The task of these ligands and their receptors is to determine which tissue the lymphocyte will enter next. They carry carbohydrates in order to be recognized by L-selectin. Addressins physically bind to mobile lymphocytes to guide them to the HEVs. Examples of molecules that are often referred to as addressins are CD34 and GlyCAM-1 on HEVs in peripheral lymph nodes, and MAdCAM-1 on endothelial cells in the intestine.

== Function ==
In terms of migration, MAdCAM-1 is selectively expressed on mucosal endothelial cells, driving memory T-cell re-circulation through mucosal tissues. In contrast, and indeed the main difference between the two molecules, ICAM molecules are involved with naïve T-cell re-circulation. Whereas MAdCAM-1 is selectively expressed, ICAM is broadly expressed on inflamed endothelium.

== Peripheral node addressins ==
Peripheral node addressins (PNAd) are carbohydrate residues that are lymphocyte homing receptor ligands that are expressed on the HEVs of peripheral lymph nodes. These proteins collectively bind to L-selectin to guide lymphocytes such as mature naïve B and T cells into the lymph node. During the development of secondary lymphoid organs, PNAd expression is upregulated following the upregulation and subsequent downregulation of MAdCAM-1 on HEVs. PNAd expression, as well as the expression of MAdCAM-1, is dependent on lymphotoxin signaling in the HEVs of lymph nodes.

== Clinical significance ==
In inflammatory bowel diseases, MAdCAM-1 can be overexpressed on the endothelial cells of intestinal mucosa and gut-associated lymphoid tissue, leading to excessive inflammation in the gut. A potential therapeutic target to manage these diseases could be the MAdCAM-1 molecules that are expressed on these cells and bring in lymphocytes. One example of a potential therapy is the fully human monoclonal antibody ontamalimab that targets and binds to MAdCAM-1, preventing it from interacting with the integrins on the surface of the lymphocytes.

== See also ==
- CD34
- GLYCAM1
- Integrin β7 - a constituent of α_{4}β_{7}
