= GLYCAM1 =

Identifiers
- Aliases: GLYCAM1, glycosylation dependent cell adhesion molecule 1 (pseudogene)
- External IDs: MGI: 95759; GeneCards: GLYCAM1; OMA:GLYCAM1 - orthologs

Gene location (Human)
Chr.	Chromosome 12 (human)
Band	12q13.2	Start	54,608,187 bp
Band	12q13.2	End	54,610,462 bp

Gene location (Mouse)
Chr.	Chromosome 15 (mouse)
Band	15 F3|15 59.03 cM	Start	103,471,186 bp
Band	15 F3|15 59.03 cM	End	103,473,508 bp
Orthologs
Species	Human	Mouse
Entrez	644076	14663
Ensembl	ENSG00000257780	ENSMUSG00000022491
UniProt	n a	Q02596
RefSeq (mRNA)	n/a	NM_001289587; NM_008134
RefSeq (protein)	n/a	NP_001276516; NP_032160
Location (UCSC)	Chr 12: 54.61 – 54.61 Mb	Chr 15: 103.47 – 103.47 Mb
PubMed search
- Wikidata
View/Edit Human	View/Edit Mouse

Glycosylation-dependent cell adhesion molecule-1 is a protein that is encoded by the GLYCAM1 gene. In humans, GLYCAM1 is a pseudogene while in many other mammals including mouse, it is a protein coding gene.

GLYCAM1 is a proteoglycan ligand expressed on cells of the high endothelial venules in lymphoid tissues. It is the ligand for the receptor L-selectin allowing for naive lymphocytes to exit the bloodstream into lymphoid tissues. GLYCAM1 binds to L-selectin by presenting one or more O-linked carbohydrates to the lectin domain of the leukocyte cell surface selectin. Data suggests that GLYCAM1 is a hormone-regulated milk protein that is part of the milk mucin complex.

GlyCAM-1 is expressed exclusively on high endothelial venules. It is unclear how GlyCAM-1 is attached to the membrane as it lacks a transmembrane region.
