= LPAM-1 =

Protein complex

Integrin α4β7 (Lymphocyte Peyer’s patch adhesion molecule-1) is an integrin heterodimer composed of CD49d (alpha-4) subunit and beta-7 subunit noncovalently linked. LPAM-1 is expressed on the cell surface of leukocytes. This receptor is involved in lymphocyte trafficking pathway to site of inflammation in intestinal tissues.

== Structure ==
LPAM-1 α and β subunits are composed of a large extracellular domain, a short transmembrane region and a cytoplasmic tail. Its ligand specificity depends on both α4 and β7 subunits.

The binding head of the β7 chain has three metal-binding sites that contributes to the cation-dependent (Ca^{2+}, Mg^{2+} and Mn^{2+}) allosteric conformational activation of the integrin α4β7. These three sites are ligand-induced metal-binding site (LIMBS), metal ion-dependent adhesion site (MIDAS) and adjacent to metal ion-dependent adhesion site (ADMIDAS). LIMBS and ADMIDAS sites regulates the cell adherence of lymphocyte by affecting the adhesion or de-adhesion of the integrin to its ligand.

In the α4 subunit, Tyr187 was identified as a critical amino acid in integrin α4β7-mediated cell adhesion. Its mutation affects interactions between integrin α4β7 and its ligands. The binding site on the α4 subunit is located on the upper surface of a N-terminal β-propeller structure where this α4 Tyr187 residue is situated.

== Function ==
LPAM-1 is constitutively expressed on naïve T and B cells at relatively low level. Furthermore it is expressed on NK cells, stimulated monocytes, macrophages and eosinophils. Memory gut-homing CD4^{+} T cells and IgA-secreting B cells have an increased expression of this integrin. Retinoic acid produced by dendritic cells induces upregulation of LPAM-1 on these cells. On contrary, most of the memory T cells that circulates to non-mucosal tissues are lacking expression of β7 integrins.

LPAM-1 is a homing receptor that mediates rolling and firm adhesion of lymphocytes to endothelial cells. Subsequently this leads to transendothelial lymphocyte diapedesis into mucosal lymphoid tissues with de-adhesion. The primary ligand of LPAM-1 is the mucosal vascular addressin cell adhesion molecule 1 (MAdCAM-1) which is specifically expressed on intestinal lamina propia postcapillary venules and gut secondary lymphoid organs like Peyer’s patches endothelial venules.

LPAM-1 can also bind to fibronectin in the extracellular matrix through a LDV motif on the CS-1 region. LPAM-1 binds with less specificity to the vascular cell adhesion molecule 1 (VCAM-1) which usually interacts with integrin α4β1 (VLA-4).

== Clinical significance ==
=== Inflammatory bowel diseases (IBD) ===
Since LPAM-1 interaction with MAdCAM-1 mediates trafficking of immune cells in the gut, unsurprisingly LPAM-1 is involved in chronic inflammatory disorders of the gastrointestinal tract. Therefore antagonists of this integrin represent an important therapeutic strategy for IBD. Several monoclonal antibodies have been developed in order to block this interaction and inhibit lymphocytes homing from blood into gut-associated lymphoid tissues. For patients with Crohn’s disease or ulcerative colitis, the expression of MAdCAM-1 is increased in inflamed mucosa.

Natalizumab (anti-α4) is a humanized IgG4 monoclonal antibody that targets α4 subunit therefore it targets both α4β7 and α4β1 integrins. It binds to the α4 β-propeller domain close to the α4-β7 groove. It has been approved for the treatment of both relapsing multiple sclerosis and moderate to severe Crohn’s disease. However, because of potential risk of progressive multifocal leukoencephalopathy it is not usually used.

Vedolizumab (anti-α4β7) is a humanized IgG1 monoclonal antibody which has been approved for the treatment of ulcerative colitis and Crohn’s disease. This antibody selectively targets integrin α4β7 binding to MAdCAM-1 and fibronectin but not to VCAM-1. It is the most used anti-integrin therapy in IBD.

Etrolizumab (anti-β7) is a monoclonal antibody that targets β7 subunit on α4β7 and αEβ7 integrins. It has been shown to be efficient for ulcerative colitis and Crohn’s disease in recent clinical trials.

Abrilumab (anti-α4β7) is a human IgG2 monoclonal antibody that has been under investigation has another anti-integrin therapy. It was tested for ulcerative colitis and Crohn’s disease and has favorable pharmacokinetics and pharmacodynamic properties.

Emvistegrast is a small molecule integrin alpha4/beta7 antagonist which, as of 2026, was being developed by Gilead Sciences for the treatment of ulcerative colitis.

=== HIV-1 ===
In acute HIV-1 infection, gastrointestinal dysfunction can be observed. Gut-associated lymphoid tissue represents a key site for HIV-1 replication and mucosal CD4^{+} T-cell depletion. Therefore the involvement of LPAM-1 in HIV-1 pathogenesis has been studied in recent years. It has been found that gp120, which is the major HIV-1 envelope glycoprotein, can bind to α4β7 integrin. However α4β7 is not necessary for the HIV-1 infection into host cells. Investigations have been conducted on anti-α4β7 strategies to block HIV-1 infection as potential therapeutics.

=== Graft versus host-disease (GVHD) ===
LPAM-1 integrin is involved in the development of graft-versus-host disease (GVHD). Donor-derived CTL cells use α4β7 integrin to migrate to gut-associated lymphoid tissues such as Peyer’s patches. Furthermore, Peyer’s patches are key sites for donor T cell activation and start of GVHD. It was proved that mice in which donor T cell migration to Peyer’s patches was blocked by an anti-MAdCAM-1 were protected from GVHD. Therefore blockade of α4β7 integrin is under investigation as a therapeutic strategy for GVHD.
