= High endothelial venules =

Venules in some lymphatic organs

High endothelial venules (HEV) are specialized post-capillary venules characterized by plump endothelial cells as opposed to the usual flatter endothelial cells found in regular venules. HEVs enable lymphocytes circulating in the blood to directly enter a lymph node (by crossing through the HEV).

In humans, HEVs are found in all secondary lymphoid organs (with the exception of spleen, where blood exits through open arterioles and enters the red pulp), including hundreds of lymph nodes dispersed in the body, tonsils and adenoids in the pharynx, Peyer's patches (PIs) in the small intestine, appendix, and small aggregates of lymphoid tissue in the stomach and large intestine. In contrast to the endothelial cells from other vessels, the high endothelial cells of HEVs have a distinctive appearance, consisting of a cuboidal morphology and with various receptors to interact with leukocytes (express specialized ligands for lymphocytes and are able to support high levels of lymphocyte extravasation). HEVs enable naïve lymphocytes to move in and out of the lymph nodes from the circulatory system. HEV cells express addressins, which are specific adhesion molecules that attach to the L-selectins on lymphocytes and anchor them to the HEV wall in preparation for crossing the endothelium.

The endothelial cells of HEVs have a 'plump' appearance different from the flat morphology of endothelial cells that line other vessels, and are therefore called high endothelial cells by reference to their thickness. Another characteristic of HEVs, revealed by light-microscopic examination, is the presence of a large number of lymphocytes within their walls. This illustrates the function of HEVs in lymphocyte recruitment and explains why these vessels were implicated in lymphocyte traffic from the time of their initial description.

== The need for HEV ==
In order to have an adaptive immune response occur, T cells need to be activated. T cells become activated by recognising foreign antigens bound to antigen presenting cells (APC), in particular, dendritic cells. In order for naïve T cells to bind to their specific antigen, they need to experience physical contact with those cells. Since antigen levels are usually low, contact in blood circulation would be unlikely. Therefore, T cells need a region where they can go to sample foreign antigens that have entered the body. When an APC, such as a dendritic cell, binds a foreign antigen, it becomes activated and moves into the lymph nodes (sites for antigen sampling by T cells) via afferent lymphatic vessels. Naïve T cells in the circulation regularly move through the lymph nodes via HEV in order to scan the APC for foreign antigens. When they encounter such an antigen, the cell becomes activated, resulting in the immune system mounting a response against the causative agent of the infection.

Depletion of CD11c+ dendritic cells in mouse significantly altered the phenotype of HEV. The normal phenotype of HEV is possibly maintained by DC-secreted lymphotoxin (TNF-beta).

== Cell movement through HEV ==
HEV cuboidal endothelial cells express the adhesion molecules GlyCAM-1 (in mucosal HEV this is MAdCAM-1), ICAM-1 and CD34. They also secrete the chemokine CCL21. Naïve T cells express CCR7 receptor and adhesion molecules L-selectin and LFA-1. As naïve T cells move through the circulation, they 'roll' over the endothelial cells in the vessel walls. The rolling mechanism helps the L-selectin molecules on the surface of naive T cells to weakly interact with GlyCAM-1 and CD34 molecules on HEV cells. The chemokine CCL21 then binds to its receptor CCR7 expressed on the T cell. This binding induces a conformational change in the LFA-1 molecule causing it to bind tightly to ICAM-1. This tight binding stops further movement of the T cell which can then move between HEV cells into the lymph node by a process termed 'diapedesis' (or extravasation).

== Markers ==
Despite intensive efforts, few HEV-specific markers have been described. The best HEV marker currently available is a carbohydrate epitope recognized by the monoclonal antibody (mAb) MECA-79, which stains all HEVs within lymphoid tissues and does not react with postcapillary venules or large vessels in spleen, thymus or nonlymphoid tissues. MECA-79 mAb inhibits lymphocyte emigration through HEVs into lymph nodes in vivo and lymphocyte adhesion to lymph node and tonsil HEVs in vitro. Although initially produced against mouse HEVs, the mAb shows a wide crossreactivity among species. The MECA-79 carbohydrate epitope decorates a family of HEV counter-receptors for L-selectin, both in mouse and human16. Another mAb, HECA-452, recognizing a carbohydrate epitope expressed on human HEVs but not on other vessels, has been described. Nevertheless, unlike MECA-79, this mAb is not HEV specific: HECA-452 recognizes a carbohydrate epitope related to the sialyl-Lewis x and sialyl-Lewis a oligosaccharides and, in addition to reacting with high endothelium, crossreacts with monocytic cells, dendritic cells and a subset of skin-homing memory lymphocytes.

Furthermore, two other HEV markers have been described in the mouse:

1. the mAb MECA-325 defines an antigen that can be induced in nonlymphoid endothelial cells by interferon γ ( IFN- γ); and
2. the mAb MECA-367 recognizes mucosal addressin cell adhesion molecule 1 (MAdCAM-1), a counter-receptor for L-selectin and α4β7 integrin that is expressed in mucosal HEVs and in venules of intestinal lamina propria but can be induced in nonmucosal endothelial cells by tumor necrosis factor cx (TNF- α) and IL-l.

== In chronic human inflammatory disease ==
The vessels with HEV characteristics appear in human tissue in association with long-standing chronic inflammation. In rheumatoid arthritis, it has been observed that the level of sulfate incorporation as well as the 'plumpness' (or 'tallness') of the endothelium in areas of lymphocytic infiltration in the synovial membrane are closely related to the concentration of the lymphocytes in the perivascular infiltrates. Similarly, expression of MECA-79 and HECA-452 on these vessels is most pronounced in association with extensive lymphoid infiltrates. Therefore, the development of bona fide HEVs in the synovial membrane of patients with rheumatoid arthritis is likely to facilitate large-scale influx of lymphocytes, leading to amplification and maintenance of chronic inflammation. The development of HEVs after prolonged inflammatory stimulus is not restricted to diseased synovium, but can also occur in other tissues, particularly the gut and thyroid. During chronic inflammation of the gut in inflammatory bowel diseases (Crohn's disease and ulcerative colitis) or the thyroid in autoimmune thyroiditis (Graves' disease and Hashimoto's thyroiditis), areas of dense lymphocytic infiltration contain vessels with plump endothelium expressing MECA-79 and HECA-452. These observations suggest that HEVs could play an important role in the pathogenesis of these diseases by mediating abnormal lymphocyte recruitment to the gut or the thyroid. MECA-79+ venules with plump endothelium have also been detected in other sites of chronic inflammation, including many cutaneous inflammatory lesions. The presence of MECA-79+ HEV-like vessels in many different human chronic inflammatory diseases indicates that L-selectin is likely to play a major role in lymphocyte emigration at chronic inflammatory sites.
