= L-selectin =

Mammalian protein found in humans

SELL
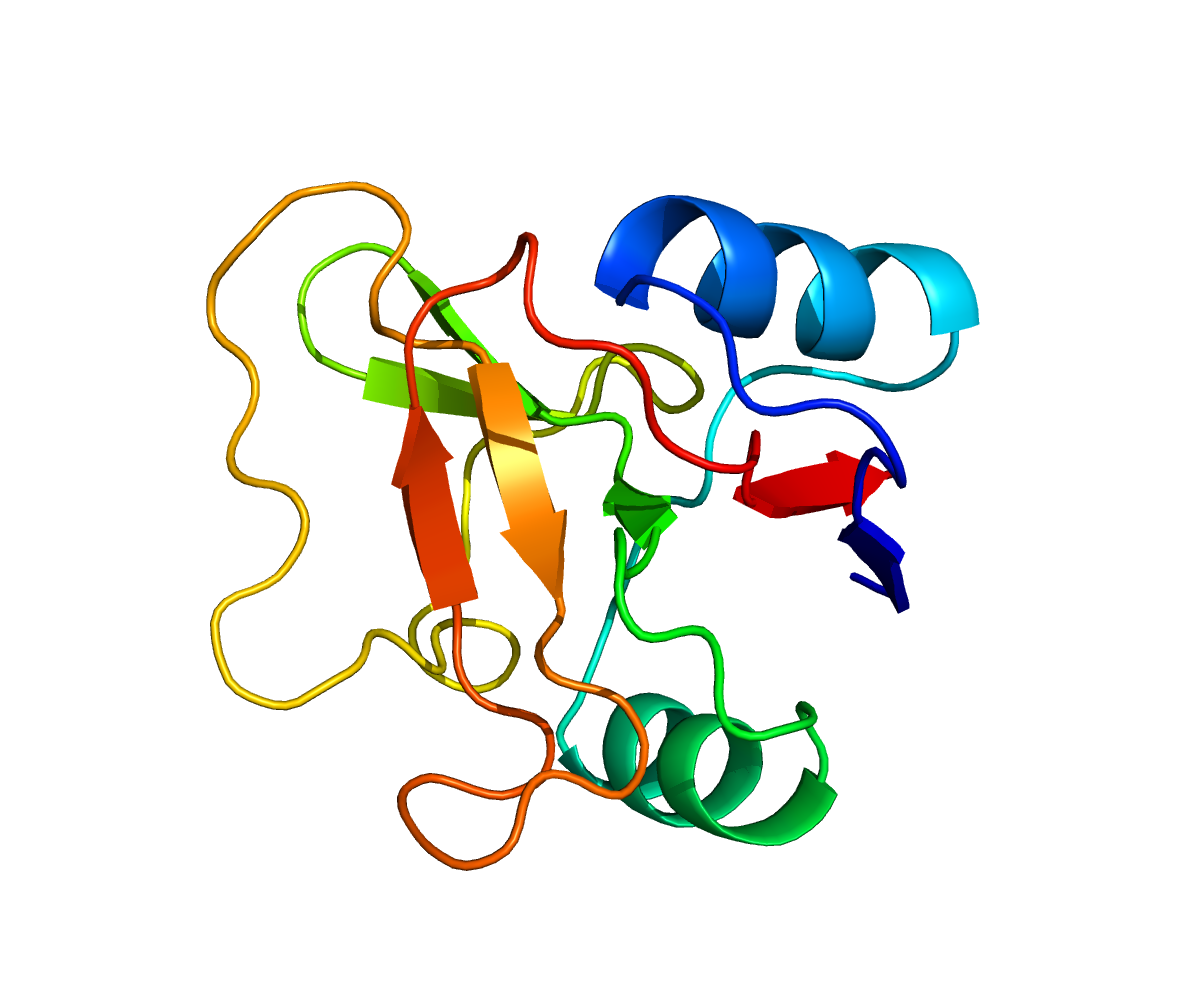

Identifiers
- Aliases: SELL, CD62L, LAM1, LECAM1, LEU8, LNHR, LSEL, LYAM1, PLNHR, TQ1, selectin L
- External IDs: OMIM: 153240; MGI: 98279; GeneCards: SELL
Available structures
PDB	Ortholog search: PDBe RCSB
PDB	List of PDB id codes 2LGF, 3CFW

Gene location (Human)
Chr.	Chromosome 1 (human)
Band	1q24.2	Start	169,690,665 bp
Band	1q24.2	End	169,711,702 bp

Gene location (Mouse)
Chr.	Chromosome 1 (mouse)
Band	1 H2.2|1 71.37 cM	Start	163,889,551 bp
Band	1 H2.2|1 71.37 cM	End	163,911,750 bp
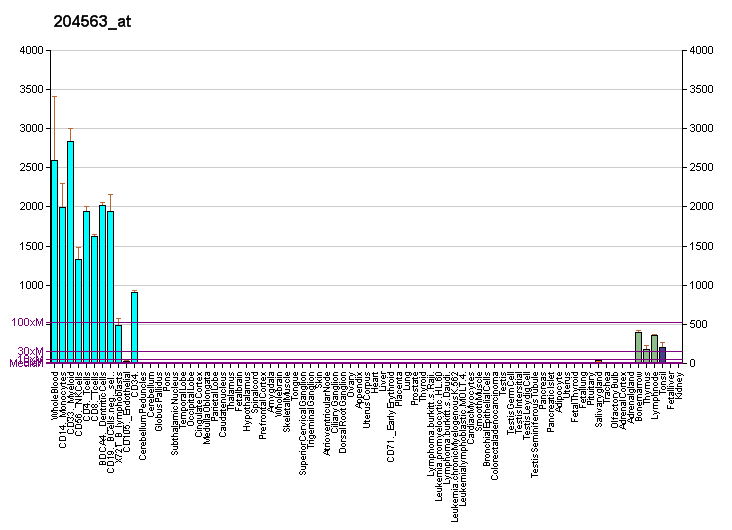
RNA expression pattern
Bgee	Human / Mouse (ortholog); Top expressed in: blood; monocyte; granulocyte; bone marrow; appendix; bone marrow cell; spleen; trabecular bone; lymph node; periodontal fiber / Top expressed in: granulocyte; spleen; blood; mesenteric lymph nodes; tibiofemoral joint; thymus; bone marrow; subcutaneous adipose tissue; right lung; right lung lobe; More reference expression data
BioGPS	More reference expression data
Gene ontology
Molecular function	protease binding; heparin binding; protein binding; glycosphingolipid binding; cell adhesion molecule binding; carbohydrate binding; calcium ion binding; oligosaccharide binding; metal ion binding
Cellular component	integral component of membrane; cell surface; plasma membrane; membrane; external side of plasma membrane; secretory granule membrane; integral component of plasma membrane
Biological process	response to ATP; cell adhesion; regulation of immune response; neutrophil degranulation; leukocyte migration; calcium-dependent cell-cell adhesion via plasma membrane cell adhesion molecules; leukocyte tethering or rolling
Sources:Amigo / QuickGO
Orthologs
Databases	NCBI: entry; OMA: entry
Species	Human	Mouse
Entrez	6402	20343
Ensembl	ENSG00000188404	ENSMUSG00000026581
UniProt	P14151	P18337
RefSeq (mRNA)	NM_000655	NM_001164059; NM_011346
RefSeq (protein)	NP_000646	NP_001157531; NP_035476
Location (UCSC)	Chr 1: 169.69 – 169.71 Mb	Chr 1: 163.89 – 163.91 Mb
PubMed search
- Wikidata
View/Edit Human	View/Edit Mouse

L-selectin, also known as CD62L, is a cell adhesion molecule found on the cell surface of leukocytes, and the blastocyst. It is coded for in humans by the SELL gene. L-selectin belongs to the selectin family of proteins, which recognize sialylated carbohydrate groups containing a Sialyl LewisX (sLeX) determinant. L-selectin plays an important role in both the innate and adaptive immune responses by facilitating leukocyte-endothelial cell adhesion events. These tethering interactions are essential for the trafficking of monocytes and neutrophils into inflamed tissue as well as the homing of lymphocytes to secondary lymphoid organs. L-selectin is also expressed by lymphoid primed hematopoietic stem cells and may participate in the migration of these stem cells to the primary lymphoid organs. In addition to its function in the immune response, L-selectin is expressed on embryonic cells and facilitates the attachment of the blastocyst to the endometrial endothelium during human embryo implantation.

L-selectin is composed of multiple structural regions: an N-terminus C-type lectin domain, an adjacent epidermal growth factor-like domain, two consensus repeat units homologous to those found in C3/C4-binding proteins, an extracellular cleavage site, a short transmembrane domain, and a cytoplasmic tail. It is cleaved by ADAM17.

== Ligands ==
The nature of the interactions between L-selectin and ligand depends on many circumstances, primarily the location of anatomically defined sites in the high vessel venules (perivascular, extravascular and intravascular).

Because of the diversity of L-selectin ligands, signals that propagate downstream of L-selectin provide information about the position of the leukocyte within the multistep adhesion cascade (binding, rolling, adhesion, and transmigration).

While L-selectin ligands on the apical side of the endothelium have long been characterized as receptors for binding and rolling, glycans enriched on the basolateral side and in the basement membrane likely control quite different signals. The binding lifetime of L-selectin with apical ligands will be on the order of milliseconds, so in contrast, L-selectin-dependent adhesion in a microenvironment without hydrodynamic shear stress (e.g., within transmigrating pseudopods) will take seconds to minutes.

- GlyCAM-1, found in the high endothelial venules of the lymph nodes.
- CD34, found on endothelial cells.
- MadCAM-1, found on endothelial cells of gut-associated lymphoid tissue.
- PSGL-1, binds with low affinity.

== Expression ==
L-selectin is expressed constitutively on most circulating leukocytes. Over time, these molecules are released through the process of ectodomain shedding and are replaced by newly synthesized L-selectin proteins. Ectodomain shedding is largely accomplished through cleavage by ADAM17.

The human L-selectin gene (sell) is located on the long arm of chromosome 1 (1q24.2), and is arranged in tandem with its family members (in the order: L-, P-, and E-selectin). Human sell consists of 10 exons and its transcription factor is FOXO 1, on the other hand the mouse sell gene is composed of 9 exons.

Subsequent splicing of exons into mature mRNA translates to a protein product with a predicted molecular mass of 30 kDa. L-selectin varies between cell types, has ranging molecular weight from 65 kDa in lymphocytes to 100 kDa in neutrophils, and is due to cell type-specific glycosylation. Most glycoproteins undergo either N- or O-linked glycosylation, and it is very likely that the type of L-selectin glycosylation determines the specific functions of individual cells, but this has not yet been investigated in detail.

L-selectin is expressed on naive T cells and is rapidly shed following T cell priming. L-selectin expression is re-activated in cytotoxic T cells once they exit the lymph node. Mature central memory T cells express L-selectin while effector memory cells do not. L-selectin is also expressed by naive B cells, with the loss of L-selectin distinguishing activated B cells destined to differentiate to antibody-secreting cells

L-selectin is expressed on circulating neutrophils and is shed following neutrophil priming. Expression of L-selectin in neutrophils decreases with neutrophil aging. Classical monocytes express high levels of L-selectin while in circulation. Shedding of L-selectin from monocytes occurs during trans-endothelial migration.

L-selectin expression is also observed on oocytes and early-stage embryos. Blastocysts express L-selectin following, but not prior to emergence from the zona pellucida. An increase in L-selectin expression is observed when both the blastocyst and cytotrophoblast attach to the endometrium. L-selectin expression decreases by the 17th week of pregnancy, and remains low or non-existent until term (2017).

== Function ==
=== Lymphocytes ===
L-selectin acts as a "homing receptor" for lymphocytes to enter secondary lymphoid tissues via high endothelial venules. Ligands present on endothelial cells will bind to lymphocytes expressing L-selectin, slowing lymphocyte trafficking through the blood, and facilitating entry into a secondary lymphoid organ at that point. The receptor is commonly found on the cell surfaces of T cells. Naive T-lymphocytes, which have not yet encountered their specific antigen, need to enter secondary lymph nodes to encounter their antigen. Central memory T-lymphocytes, which have encountered antigen, express L-selectin to localize in secondary lymphoid organs. Here they reside ready to proliferate upon re-encountering antigen. Effector memory T-lymphocytes do not express L-selectin, as they circulate in the periphery and have immediate effector functions upon encountering antigen. High expression of L-selectin on human bone marrow progenitor cells is an early sign of cells becoming committed to lymphoid differentiation.

=== Neutrophils and monocytes ===
Similar to its role in homing lymphocytes to secondary lymphoid tissues, L-selectin expressed on the surface of monocytes and neutrophils is essential for facilitating the first stage of adhesion to venule epithelial cells (known as the "rolling stage"). Adhesion to activated epithelial cells is a critical step in the immune response as it allows these immune cells to emigrate from the bloodstream into inflamed tissue. Prolonged rolling and transmigration of neutrophils can trigger shedding of L-selectin from the neutrophil plasma membrane. The membrane-bound fragment left behind following cleavage of L-selectin has also been suggested to play a critical role in the interstitial chemotaxis of neutrophils along a cytokine gradient. L-selectin on neutrophils can result in its own ectodomain shedding, driven by activation of p38 MAPK followed by antibody-mediated clustering (AMC), after which L-selectin can behave as a cell adhesion molecule and signaling receptor. L-selectin shedding is not strictly consequence of neutrophil transmigration, because it was observed that there is differences between neutrophil migration toward acute or chronic inflammation could differ in the expression and turnover of adhesion molecules.

L-selectin shedding also occurs in monocytes; however, in these cells shedding is triggered only during trans-endothelial and not by earlier stages of the adhesion process. The specific shedding of L-selectin from the leading migratory fronts of transmigrating monocytes suggests that this process plays a role in facilitating the directional migration of these cells (2019).

=== Embryo ===
L-selectin is also present on the surface of human embryo trophoblasts prior to implantation into the uterus. Similar to its function in lymphocytes, L-selectin acts as a receptor to facilitate adhesion of the embryo to the site of invasion on the surface epithelium of the uterine endometrium. The embryo secretes human chorionic gonadotropin (hCG), which downregulates anti-adhesion factor, MUC-1, located on the uterine epithelium at the site of invasion. Removal of MUC-1 exposes the oligosaccharide ligands of the uterine epithelium, thus allowing binding by the L-selectin receptor of the trophoblast cell, followed by embryo adhesion and invasion.

== Clinical significance ==
=== Human immunodeficiency virus (HIV) ===
L-selectin expressed on CD4 T lymphocytes has been implicated in mediating adhesion and entry of HIV. L-selectin binds gp120, one of the many glycans present on the HIV envelope. This binding allows for rolling adhesion to T cells and thus facilitates the binding of HIV to its target receptors. Infection of the cell triggers shedding of L-selectin. The loss of L-selectin likely aids in the release of new virus from the cell.

=== Abnormal pregnancy and infertility ===
The binding of L-selectin to its ligands plays an important role in embryo implantation during human pregnancy. Deficiency epithelial expression of L-selectin ligands has been associated with infertility, while increased expression has been implicated in ectopic pregnancies.

=== Cancer ===
The adhesive properties of L-selectin have been shown to contribute to cancer progression. L-selectin interactions participate in trafficking of chronic lymphocytic leukemia cells to the lymph nodes where they are able to proliferate and evolve. Additionally, L-selectin interactions may play a role in metastasis.
